= 2004 World Junior Ice Hockey Championships rosters =

Below are the rosters for teams competing in the 2004 World Junior Ice Hockey Championships.

== Group A ==
=== United States ===
- Head coach: (United States) Mike Eaves

Pos.	No.	Player	Team	NHL Rights
GK	1	Dominic Vicari	(United States) Michigan State University	
GK	29	Al Montoya	(United States) University of Michigan	
D	2	Mark Stuart	(United States) Colorado College	Boston Bruins
D	3	Corey Potter	(United States) Michigan State University	New York Rangers
D	4	Matt Carle	(United States) University of Denver	San Jose Sharks
D	5	Matt Hunwick	(United States) University of Michigan	
D	6	Danny Richmond	(Canada) London Knights	Carolina Hurricanes
D	7	Ryan Suter	(United States) University of Wisconsin	Nashville Predators
D	10	Jeff Likens	(United States) University of Wisconsin	
D	20	James Wisniewski	(United States) Plymouth Whalers	Chicago Blackhawks
F	9	Patrick Eaves	(United States) Boston College	Ottawa Senators
F	11	Zach Parise	(United States) University of North Dakota	New Jersey Devils
F	12	Patrick O'Sullivan	(Canada) Mississauga IceDogs	Minnesota Wild
F	14	Brady Murray	(United States) University of North Dakota	Los Angeles Kings
F	15	Greg Moore	(United States) University of Maine	Calgary Flames
F	16	Jake Dowell	(United States) University of Wisconsin	
F	17	Ryan Kesler	(Canada) Manitoba Moose	Vancouver Canucks
F	19	Drew Stafford	(United States) University of North Dakota	
F	21	David Booth	(United States) Michigan State University	
F	22	Dan Fritsche	(United States) Columbus Blue Jackets	Columbus Blue Jackets
F	24	Brett Sterling	(United States) Colorado College	Atlanta Thrashers
F	27	Stephen Werner	(United States) University of Massachusetts Amherst	

=== Slovakia ===
- Head coach: (Slovakia) Jozef Frühauf and (Slovakia) Robert Spišák

Pos.	No.	Player	Team	NHL Rights
GK	1	Jaroslav Halák	(Slovakia) HC Slovan Bratislava	Montreal Canadiens
GK	30	Jozef Račko	(Slovakia) HK Nitra	
D	4	Juraj Liška	(Canada) Acadie-Bathurst Titan	
D	5	Michal Gavalier	(Canada) Shawinigan Cataractes	
D	6	Ivan Baranka	(Canada) Everett Silvertips	
D	16	Andrej Meszároš	(Slovakia) HK Dukla Trencin	
D	18	Milan Hruška	(Canada) P.E.I. Rocket	
D	24	Richard Stehlík	(United States) Lewiston MAINEiacs	Nashville Predators
D	26	Juraj Senko	(Slovakia) MsHK Žilina	
F	7	Vladislav Baláž	(United States) Lewiston MAINEiacs	
F	8	Rastislav Špirko	(United States) Tri-City Storm	
F	9	Tomáš Pokrivčák	(Slovakia) MHC Martin	
F	11	Tomáš Bulík	(Slovakia) HC Košice	
F	14	Štefan Blaho	(Canada) Sudbury Wolves	New York Islanders
F	15	Branislav Fábry	(Slovakia) HC Slovan Bratislava	Buffalo Sabres
F	20	Pavol Hajduk	(Czech Republic) HC Sparta Praha	
F	21	Michal Lukáč	(United States) Tri-City Storm	
F	23	Štefan Ružička	(Canada) Owen Sound Attack	Philadelphia Flyers
F	25	Martin Šagát	(Canada) Kootenay Ice	Toronto Maple Leafs
F	27	Tomáš Troliga	(Canada) Calgary Hitmen	St. Louis Blues
F	28	Karol Biermann	(Slovakia) HC Slovan Bratislava	
F	29	Vladimir Kútny	(Canada) Quebec Remparts	Detroit Red Wings

=== Russia ===
- Head coach: (Russia) Rafail Ishmatov

Pos.	No.	Player	Team	NHL Rights
GK	20	Denis Khudyakov	(Russia) Severstal Cherepovets	
GK	30	Konstantin Barulin	(Russia) Gazovik Tyumen	St. Louis Blues
D	2	Denis Yezhov	(Russia) Metallurg Magnitogorsk	Buffalo Sabres
D	3	Konstantin Korneyev	(Russia) Ak Bars Kazan	Montreal Canadiens
D	4	Andrei Spiridonov	(Russia) SKA St. Petersburg	
D	5	Dmitri Kosmachev	(Russia) HC CSKA Moscow	Columbus Blue Jackets
D	21	Sergei Gimayev	(Russia) Severstal Cherepovets	Ottawa Senators
D	22	Mikhail Tyulyapkin	(Russia) Torpedo Nizhni Novgorod	Minnesota Wild
D	25	Sergei Karpov	(Russia) HC Dynamo Moscow	
D	26	Denis Grot	(Russia) Lokomotiv Yaroslavl	Vancouver Canucks
F	6	Dmitri Pestunov	(Russia) Metallurg Magnitogorsk	Phoenix Coyotes
F	8	Alexander Ovechkin	(Russia) HC Dynamo Moscow	
F	10	Alexander Syomin	(United States) Washington Capitals	Washington Capitals
F	14	Yevgeni Tunik	(Russia) SKA St. Petersburg	New York Islanders
F	16	Alexei Shkotov	(Canada) Quebec Remparts	St. Louis Blues
F	17	Evgeni Malkin	(Russia) Metallurg Magnitogorsk	
F	19	Ilya Krikunov	(Russia) Khimik Voskresensk	Vancouver Canucks
F	23	Yuri Yermolin	(Russia) Avangard Omsk	
F	24	Grigori Shafigulin	(Russia) Lokomotiv Yaroslavl	Nashville Predators
F	27	Alexander Kozhevnikov	(Canada) Val d'Or Foreurs	Chicago Blackhawks
F	28	Dmitri Kazionov	(Russia) HC Lada Togliatti	Tampa Bay Lightning
F	29	Sergei Anshakov	(Russia) HC CSKA Moscow	Los Angeles Kings

=== Sweden ===
- Head coach: (Sweden) Torgny Bendelin

Pos.	No.	Player	Team	NHL Rights
GK	1	Magnus Åkerlund	(Sweden) HV71	
GK	30	Joakim Lundström	(Sweden) Brynäs IF	
D	2	Pierre Johnsson	(Sweden) Mora IK	Calgary Flames
D	3	Henrik Blomqvist	(Sweden) Växjö HC	
D	4	Daniel Sondell	(Sweden) IF Björklöven	
D	5	Johan Fransson	(Sweden) Luleå HF	
D	6	Tobias Enström	(Sweden) Modo Hockey	Atlanta Thrashers
D	7	Alexander Täng	(Sweden) Frölunda HC	
D	25	Johan Björk	(Sweden) Malmö Redhawks	Ottawa Senators
F	8	Niklas Eckerblom	(Sweden) Djurgårdens IF Hockey	Minnesota Wild
F	9	Robert Nilsson	(Sweden) Leksands IF	New York Islanders
F	10	Fredrik Johansson	(Sweden) Frölunda HC	Edmonton Oilers
F	11	Nicklas Danielsson	(Sweden) Brynäs IF	Vancouver Canucks
F	13	Sebastian Meijer	(Sweden) HV71	
F	15	Monir Kalgoum	(Sweden) Huddinge IK	
F	16	Johannes Salmonsson	(Sweden) Djurgårdens IF Hockey	
F	17	Alexander Steen	(Sweden) Frölunda HC	Toronto Maple Leafs
F	18	Patric Blomdahl	(Sweden) AIK IF	Washington Capitals
F	21	Loui Eriksson	(Sweden) Frölunda HC	Dallas Stars
F	22	Alexander Hult	(Sweden) HV71	San Jose Sharks
F	26	Johan Andersson	(Sweden) IF Troja/Ljungby	Chicago Blackhawks
F	29	Andreas Valdix	(Sweden) Malmö Redhawks	Washington Capitals

=== Austria ===
- Head coach: (Austria) Herbert Pöck

Pos.	No.	Player	Team	NHL Rights
GK	1	Mathias Lange	(United States) Billings Bulls	
GK	2	Thomas Innerwinkler	(Sweden) Frölunda HC	
D	3	Stefan Pittl	(Austria) EC Salzburg	
D	4	Martin Dobner	(Austria) Villacher SV	
D	5	Christoph Quantschnig	(Austria) Klagenfurter AC	
D	7	Philipp Kink	(Austria) Wiener Eislöwen	
D	18	Martin Oraže	(Austria) Villacher SV	
D	23	Johannes Kirisits	(Austria) Klagenfurter AC	
D	24	Victor Lindgren	(Austria) EK Zell am See	
F	6	Rafael Rotter	(Austria) Wiener Eislöwen	
F	9	Yanick Bodemann	(Switzerland) HC Sierre-Anniviers	
F	10	Andreas Nödl	(Austria) Wiener Eislöwen	
F	11	Franz Wilfan	(United States) Valley Jr. Warriors	
F	12	Tino Teppert	(Austria) Klagenfurter AC	
F	14	Philipp Pinter	(Austria) Villacher SV	
F	15	Manuel Latusa	(Austria) Vienna Capitals	
F	16	Patrick Harand	(Austria) Vienna Capitals	
F	19	Christoph Ibounig	(Austria) Klagenfurter AC	
F	20	Christoph Rud	(Austria) EK Zell am See	
F	21	Nikolas Petrik	(Austria) EC Graz 99ers	
F	26	Thomas Vanek	(United States) University of Minnesota	Buffalo Sabres
F	27	Matthias Iberer	(Austria) EC Graz 99ers	

== Group B ==
=== Canada ===
- Head coach: (Canada) Mario Durocher

Pos.	No.	Player	Team	NHL Rights
GK	1	Marc-André Fleury	(United States) Pittsburgh Penguins	Pittsburgh Penguins
GK	35	Josh Harding	(Canada) Regina Pats	Minnesota Wild
D	2	Derek Meech	(Canada) Red Deer Rebels	Detroit Red Wings
D	3	Dion Phaneuf	(Canada) Red Deer Rebels	Calgary Flames
D	5	Josh Gorges	(Canada) Kelowna Rockets	
D	6	Kevin Klein	(Canada) Guelph Storm	Nashville Predators
D	29	Braydon Coburn	(United States) Portland Winterhawks	Atlanta Thrashers
D	32	Brent Seabrook	(Canada) Lethbridge Hurricanes	Chicago Blackhawks
D	37	Shawn Belle	(United States) Tri-City Americans	St. Louis Blues
F	8	Tim Brent	(Canada) Toronto St. Michael's Majors	Mighty Ducks of Anaheim
F	9	Jeff Carter	(Canada) Sault Ste. Marie Greyhounds	Philadelphia Flyers
F	12	Anthony Stewart	(Canada) Kingston Frontenacs	Florida Panthers
F	15	Ryan Getzlaf	(Canada) Calgary Hitmen	Mighty Ducks of Anaheim
F	16	Daniel Paille	(Canada) Guelph Storm	Buffalo Sabres
F	18	Mike Richards	(Canada) Kitchener Rangers	Philadelphia Flyers
F	19	Jeff Tambellini	(United States) University of Michigan	Los Angeles Kings
F	21	Jeremy Colliton	(Canada) Prince Albert Raiders	New York Islanders
F	22	Brent Burns	(United States) Minnesota Wild	Minnesota Wild
F	24	Stephen Dixon	(Canada) Cape Breton Screaming Eagles	Pittsburgh Penguins
F	25	Max Talbot	(Canada) Gatineau Olympiques	Pittsburgh Penguins
F	27	Nigel Dawes	(Canada) Kootenay Ice	New York Rangers
F	28	Sidney Crosby	(Canada) Rimouski Océanic	Pittsburgh Penguins

=== Finland ===
- Head coach: (Finland) Hannu Aravirta

Pos.	No.	Player	Team	NHL Rights
GK	1	Mikael Vuorio	(Finland) Mikkelin Jukurit	Florida Panthers
GK	30	Hannu Toivonen	(United States) Providence Bruins	Boston Bruins
D	3	Sami Lepistö	(Finland) Jokerit	
D	4	Janne Jalasvaara	(Finland) Blues Espoo	
D	5	Mikko Kalteva	(Finland) Jokerit	Colorado Avalanche
D	7	Anssi Salmela	(Finland) Tappara	
D	8	Ville Varakas	(Finland) HIFK	
D	21	Kevin Kantee	(Finland) Jokerit	Chicago Blackhawks
D	24	Oskari Korpikari	(Finland) Oulun Kärpät	Montreal Canadiens
F	10	Sean Bergenheim	(United States) New York Islanders	New York Islanders
F	12	Valtteri Filppula	(Finland) Jokerit	Detroit Red Wings
F	13	Arsi Piispanen	(Finland) Jokerit	Columbus Blue Jackets
F	15	Tommi Oksa	(Finland) Jokerit	
F	18	Jyri Junnila	(Finland) Oulun Kärpät	
F	19	Lennart Petrell	(Finland) HIFK	
F	20	Joni Töykkälä	(Finland) Blues Espoo	
F	22	Teemu Nurmi	(Finland) Tappara	
F	23	Jarkko Immonen	(Finland) Blues Espoo	Dallas Stars
F	25	Lauri Tukonen	(Finland) Blues Espoo	
F	26	Petri Kontiola	(Finland) Tappara	
F	27	Petteri Nokelainen	(Finland) SaiPa	
F	29	Masi Marjamäki	(Canada) Moose Jaw Warriors	Boston Bruins

=== Czech Republic ===
- Head coach: (Czech Republic) Alois Hadamczik

Pos.	No.	Player	Team	NHL Rights
GK	1	Marek Schwarz	(Czech Republic) HC Sparta Praha	
GK	2	Tomáš Pöpperle	(Czech Republic) HC Sparta Praha	
D	4	Ondřej Němec	(Czech Republic) VHK Vsetín	Pittsburgh Penguins
D	5	Martin Vágner	(Canada) Gatineau Olympiques	Dallas Stars
D	6	Ctirad Ovčačík	(Czech Republic) HC Berounští Medvědi	
D	7	Michal Barinka	(United States) Norfolk Admirals	Chicago Blackhawks
D	10	Marek Chvátal	(Canada) Sarnia Sting	New Jersey Devils
D	11	Tomáš Linhart	(Czech Republic) HC Moeller Pardubice	Montreal Canadiens
D	12	Ladislav Šmíd	(Czech Republic) HC Bílí Tygři Liberec	
F	9	Petr Kanko	(Canada) Kitchener Rangers	Los Angeles Kings
F	15	Karel Hromas	(Czech Republic) HC Sparta Praha	
F	16	Tomáš Fleischmann	(Canada) Moose Jaw Warriors	Detroit Red Wings
F	18	Jakub Koreis	(Canada) Guelph Storm	Phoenix Coyotes
F	19	Kamil Kreps	(Canada) Brampton Battalion	Florida Panthers
F	21	Jakub Klepiš	(Czech Republic) HC Slavia Praha	Ottawa Senators
F	22	Radim Hruška	(Czech Republic) VHK Vsetín	
F	23	Jakub Šindel	(Czech Republic) HC Sparta Praha	
F	24	Jiří Hudler	(United States) Detroit Red Wings	Detroit Red Wings
F	25	Rostislav Olesz	(Czech Republic) HC Vítkovice	
F	26	Vojtěch Polák	(Czech Republic) HC Energie Karlovy Vary	Dallas Stars
F	27	Roman Vondráček	(Czech Republic) HC Sparta Praha	
F	28	Lukáš Kašpar	(Czech Republic) HC Litvínov	

=== Switzerland ===
- Head coach: (Switzerland) Jakob Kölliker

Pos.	No.	Player	Team	NHL Rights
GK	1	Michael Tobler	(Switzerland) EV Zug	
GK	20	Daniel Manzato	(Canada) Victoriaville Tigres	Carolina Hurricanes
D	2	Lukas Baumgartner	(Switzerland) Kloten Flyers	
D	6	Tim Ramholt	(Canada) Cape Breton Screaming Eagles	Calgary Flames
D	8	Philippe Seydoux	(Switzerland) Kloten Flyers	Ottawa Senators
D	10	Martin Stettler	(Switzerland) SCL Tigers	
D	23	Silvan Anthamatten	(Switzerland) EV Zug	
D	27	Andri Stoffel	(Switzerland) ZSC Lions	
F	3	Gianni Ehrensperger	(Switzerland) Kloten Flyers	
F	11	Patrik Bärtschi	(Switzerland) Kloten Flyers	Pittsburgh Penguins
F	12	Yvan Benoit	(Switzerland) Genève-Servette HC	
F	13	Lukas Grauwiler	(Canada) Mississauga IceDogs	
F	14	Christoph Roder	(Switzerland) EHC Biel	
F	15	Peter Guggisberg	(Switzerland) HC Davos	
F	17	Emanuel Peter	(Switzerland) Kloten Flyers	Calgary Flames
F	18	Morris Trachsler	(Switzerland) ZSC Lions	
F	19	Roland Gerber	(Switzerland) SCL Tigers	
F	21	Kevin Romy	(Switzerland) Genève-Servette HC	Philadelphia Flyers
F	22	Victor Stăncescu	(Switzerland) Kloten Flyers	
F	25	Antonio Rizzello	(Switzerland) SC Rapperswil-Jona	
F	29	Steivan Hasler	(Switzerland) HC Davos	

=== Ukraine ===
- Head coach: (Ukraine) Serhiy Lubnin

Pos.	No.	Player	Team	NHL Rights
GK	1	Sergei Gavrilyuk	(Ukraine) Sokil Kyiv	
GK	20	Ilya Tarankov	(Russia) HC Rybinsk	
GK	30	Yevgeni Galyuk	(Ukraine) Sokil Kyiv	
D	2	Igor Kugut	(Russia) Gazovik Tyumen	
D	3	Kirill Katrich	(Ukraine) Sokil Kyiv	
D	5	Pavel Akimov	(Ukraine) Sokil Kyiv	
D	6	Ivan Nadzen	(Ukraine) Sokil Kyiv	
D	8	Olexei Lubnin	(Russia) Olimpiya Kirovo-Chepetsk	
D	25	Vadim Gnyazdovsky	(Ukraine) Sokil Kyiv	
F	11	Olexander Shevchenko	(Ukraine) Sokil Kyiv	
F	12	Pavel Bolshakov	(Ukraine) Barvynok Kharkiv	
F	13	Pavel Legachev	(Ukraine) Sokil Kyiv	
F	14	Sergei Chernenko	(Ukraine) Sokil Kyiv	
F	15	Viktor Andrushchenko	(Belarus) Khimvolokno Mogilev	
F	17	Olexei Voytsekhovsky	(Belarus) HC Gomel	
F	18	Vitali Kirichenko	(Ukraine) Sokil Kyiv	
F	19	Olexei Koval	(Ukraine) Sokil Kyiv	
F	22	Yevgeni Onischenko	(Ukraine) Sokil Kyiv	
F	23	Igor Shamansky	(Russia) Gazovik Tyumen	
F	24	Yegor Rufanov	(Ukraine) Sokil Kyiv	
F	26	Anatoli Bogdanov	(Finland) TuTo	
F	27	Sergei Madera	(Ukraine) Sokil Kyiv	
