= 2004 World Junior Ice Hockey Championships =

International junior ice hockey tournament

2004 IIHF World U20 Championship

Tournament details
- Host country: Finland
- Venues: 2 (in 2 host cities)
- Dates: December 26, 2003 – January 5, 2004
- Teams: 10

Final positions
- Champions: United States (1st title)
- Runners-up: Canada
- Third place: Finland
- Fourth place: Czech Republic

Tournament statistics
- Games played: 31
- Goals scored: 190 (6.13 per game)
- Attendance: 116,556 (3,760 per game)
- Scoring leader: (Canada) Nigel Dawes (11 points)

Awards
- MVP: (United States) Zach Parise

The 2004 World Junior Ice Hockey Championships (2004 WJHC) was held between December 26, 2003, and January 5, 2004, in Helsinki and Hämeenlinna, Finland. The United States won their first ever gold medal, after defeating Canada 4–3 in the final.

== Venues ==
Helsinki Ice Arena Capacity: 8,200	Hameenlinna Ice Arena Capacity: 5,360
Finland – Helsinki	Finland – Hämeenlinna

== Top Division ==
=== Preliminary round ===
==== Group A ====
Pos	Team	Pld	W	D	L	GF	GA	GD	Pts	Qualification
1	United States	4	4	0	0	21	4	+17	8	Semifinals
2	Slovakia	4	2	1	1	9	7	+2	5	Quarterfinals
3	Russia	4	2	1	1	11	10	+1	5	Quarterfinals
4	Sweden	4	1	0	3	13	10	+3	2	Relegation round
5	Austria	4	0	0	4	1	24	−23	0	Relegation round

All times local (EET/UTC+2).

December 26, 2003; 15:00	Slovakia	2–2 (0–1, 1–0, 0–1)	Russia	Hämeenlinna; Attendance: 3,884

Game reference

Jaroslav Halák
Goalies
Konstantin Barulin
Referee:
(Canada) Derek Herman
Linesmen:
(Finland) Stefan Fonselius
(Finland) Seppo Lindroos

	0 – 1	02:43 – PP1 – Ovechkin (Shkotov, Pestunov)
Ružička (Bulík, Špirko) – 21:02	1 – 1
	1 – 2	40:30 – Shkotov (Ovechkin, Korneev)
Šagát (Baláž) – 50:37	2 – 2

12 min
Penalties
6 min
28
Shots
33

December 26, 2003; 18:30	Austria	0–8 (0–2, 0–3, 0–3)	United States	Hämeenlinna; Attendance: 3,947

Game reference

Mathias Lange
Goalies
Al Montoya
Referee:
(Russia) Sergej Kafrabanov
Linesmen:
(Czech Republic) Stanislav Barvir
(Canada) Derek Doucette

0 – 1	02:09 – PP1 – Wisniewski (Parise)
0 – 2	08:12 – Sterling (Stuart, Montoya)
0 – 3	30:49 – PP2 – Parise (Richmond, Eaves)
0 – 4	31:05 – PP1 – Kesler (Eaves)
0 – 5	34:46 – SH1 – Eaves (Likens)
0 – 6	48:55 – Parise (Fritsche)
0 – 7	52:17 – PP1 – Parise (Wisniewski)
0 – 8	54:14 – Sterling (Stuart)

14 min
Penalties
18 min
15
Shots
61

December 27, 2003; 16:00	Sweden	7–0 (1–0, 1–0, 5–0)	Austria	Hämeenlinna; Attendance: 741

Game reference

Joakim Lundstrom
Goalies
Mathias Lange
Referee:
(Finland) Jyri Petteri Ronn
Linesmen:
(Norway) Thomas Geinke
(Germany) Christian Neubert

Blomdahl (Björk, Eckerblom) – 10:47	1 – 0
Kalgoum (Salmonsson) – 32:19	2 – 0
Johnsson (Eckerblom, Andersson) – 46:53	3 – 0
Steen (Eriksson) – 47:42	4 – 0
Danielsson (Tang) – PP1 - 54:02	5 – 0
Fransson (Nilsson, Andersson) – 54:32	6 – 0
Fransson (Blomqvist, Danielsson) – PP2 – 58:55	7 – 0

10 min
Penalties
24 min
43
Shots
16

December 28, 2003; 15:00	United States	5–0 (1–0, 1–0, 3–0)	Slovakia	Hämeenlinna; Attendance: 3,938

Game reference

Al Montoya
Goalies
Jaroslav Halák
Referee:
(Czech Republic) Vladimír Šindler
Linesmen:
(Canada) Derek Doucette
(Finland) Stefan Fonselius

Booth (Dowell) - 08:05	1 – 0
Murray (Richmond) – PP1 – 27:00	2 – 0
Murray – 44:32	3 – 0
Kesler – PP1 – 48:15	4 – 0
Werner (Parise) – 50:23	5 – 0

16 min
Penalties
28 min
43
Shots
18

December 28, 2003; 18:30	Russia	5–3 (2–0, 0–2, 3–1)	Sweden	Helsinki; Attendance: 2,801

Game reference

Konstantin Barulin
Goalies
Joakim Lundström
Referee:
(Germany) Wilhelm Schimm
Linesmen:
(Czech Republic) Stanislav Barvir
(Finland) Seppo Lindroos

Semin (Malkin, Anshakov) – PP1 – 07:07	1 – 0
Ovechkin (Korneev, Malkin) – PP1 – 18:30	2 – 0
	2 – 1	35:08 – Andersson (Valdix)
	2 – 2	36:15 – Kalgoum (Hult)
Anshakov (Malkin) – 46:38	3 – 2
	3 – 3	50:55 – PP1 – Nilsson (Björk, Tang)
Anshakov (Spiridonov, Semin) – 56:35	4 – 3
Shkotov (Ovechkin, Pestunov) – ENG – 59:59	5 – 3

10 min
Penalties
20 min
29
Shots
26

December 29, 2003; 18:30	Austria	1–3 (0–1, 1–1, 0–1)	Russia	Hämeenlinna; Attendance: 831

Game reference

Mathias Lange
Thomas Innerwinkler
Goalies
Denis Khudyakov
Referee:
(Canada) Derek Herman
Linesmen:
(Finland) Stefan Fonselius
(Germany) Christian Neubert

	0 – 1	17:38 – Anshakov (Gimaev, Semin)
Vanek (Latusa, Harand) – 26:55	1 – 1
	1 – 2	31:32 – Malkin (Spiridonov, Khudyakov)
	1 – 3	53:14 – Ovechkin (Korneev, Shkotov)

12 min
Penalties
8 min
17
Shots
50

December 30, 2003; 16:00	United States	4–3 (2–0, 1–2, 1–1)	Sweden	Hämeenlinna; Attendance: 3,948

Game reference

Al Montoya
Goalies
Magnus Åkerlund
Joakim Lundström
Referee:
(Canada) Derek Herman
Linesmen:
(Czech Republic) Stanislav Barvir
(Finland) Seppo Lindroos

Werner (Wisniewski, Parise) – PP1 – 05:26	1 – 0
Carle (Dowell, Stafford) – 11:29	2 – 0
	2 – 1	25:34 – Steen
Sterling (Moore, Suter) – 33:21	3 – 1
	3 – 2	35:22 – Fransson (Valdix, Andersson)
	3 – 3	47:25 – PP1 – Meijer (Enström)
Werner (Parise, Wisniewski) – SH1 – 48:42	4 – 3

12 min
Penalties
14 min
40
Shots
25

December 30, 2003; 19:30	Slovakia	6–0 (1–0, 4–0, 1–0)	Austria	Hämeenlinna; Attendance: 3,935

Game reference

Jaroslav Halák
Goalies
Mathias Lange
Thomas Innerwinkler
Referee:
(Finland) Jyri Petteri Ronn
Linesmen:
(Norway) Thomas Gienke
(Finland) Seppo Lindroos

Meszároš (Pokrivčák, Špirko) – PP1 – 08:21	1 – 0
Ružička (Stehlík) – 29:21	2 – 0
Stehlík (Biermann, Lukáč) – 29:29	3 – 0
Ružička – 31:41	4 – 0
Troliga (Špirko, Baranka) – 33:49	5 – 0
Špirko (Hruška, Pokrivčák) – 50:12	6 – 0

10 min
Penalties
6 min
42
Shots
21

December 31, 2003; 16:00	Russia	1–4 (0–3, 0–1, 1–0)	United States	Hämeenlinna; Attendance: 3,874

Game reference

Konstantin Barulin
Denis Khudyakov
Goalies
Al Montoya
Referee:
(Czech Republic) Vladimír Šindler
Linesmen:
(Canada) Derek Doucette
(Czech Republic) Stanislav Barvir

	0 – 1	09:45 – PP1 – O'Sullivan (Eaves, Suter)
	0 – 2	18:48 – PP2 – Parise (Eaves)
	0 – 3	19:21 – PP1 – Werner (Parise)
	0 – 4	35:57 – SH1 – Parise
Anshakov (Gimaev, Spiridonov) – PP2 – 50:45	1 – 4

34 min
Penalties
24 min
30
Shots
35

December 31, 2003; 19:30	Sweden	0–1 (0–0, 0–0, 0–1)	Slovakia	Hämeenlinna; Attendance: 3,860

Game reference
Joakim Lundström	Goalies	Jaroslav Halák	Referee: (Finland) Jyri Petteri Ronn; Linesmen: (Finland) Seppo Lindroos (Finland) Stefan Fonselius
0 – 1 / 59:24 – ENG – Fábry (Ružička, Bulík)			Referee: (Finland) Jyri Petteri Ronn; Linesmen: (Finland) Seppo Lindroos (Finland) Stefan Fonselius
4 min	Penalties	4 min	Referee: (Finland) Jyri Petteri Ronn; Linesmen: (Finland) Seppo Lindroos (Finland) Stefan Fonselius
28	Shots	24	Referee: (Finland) Jyri Petteri Ronn; Linesmen: (Finland) Seppo Lindroos (Finland) Stefan Fonselius

==== Group B ====
Pos	Team	Pld	W	D	L	GF	GA	GD	Pts	Qualification
1	Canada	4	4	0	0	25	4	+21	8	Semifinals
2	Finland	4	3	0	1	19	6	+13	6	Quarterfinals
3	Czech Republic	4	2	0	2	14	9	+5	4	Quarterfinals
4	Switzerland	4	1	0	3	14	11	+3	2	Relegation round
5	Ukraine	4	0	0	4	1	43	−42	0	Relegation round

All times local (EET/UTC+2).

December 26, 2003; 15:00	Czech Republic	8–0 (4–0, 4–0, 0–0)	Ukraine	Helsinki

Game reference

December 26, 2003; 18:30	Canada	3–0 (1–0, 1–0, 1–0)	Finland	Helsinki; Attendance: 3,947

Game reference

Referee:
(Sweden) Thomas Andersson
Linesmen:
(Slovakia) Miroslav Halecký
(Sweden) Mikael Ljungqvist

Phaneuf (Stewart, Dawes) – 15:52	1 – 0
Paille (Talbot) – 32:41	2 – 0
Stewart (Richards) – 44:27	3 – 0

8 min
Penalties
4 min

December 27, 2003; 16:00	Switzerland	11–0 (3–0, 5–0, 3–0)	Ukraine	Helsinki

Game reference

December 28, 2003; 15:00	Canada	7–2 (3–1, 1–0, 3–1)	Switzerland	Helsinki; Attendance: 1,320

Game reference

Marc-André Fleury
Goalies
Daniel Manzato
Referee:
(Slovakia) Peter Ország
Linesmen:
(Germany) Christian Neubert
(Norway) Thomas Gienke

	0 – 1	04:43 – Grauwiler (Bärtschi)
Richards – PS – 08:13	1 – 1
Coburn (Burns) – 10:46	2 – 1
Getzlaf (Seabrook) – PP1 – 16:24	3 – 1
Getzlaf (Carter, Burns) – 23:35	4 – 1
Stewart (Dawes) – 41:41	5 – 1
	5 – 2	43:09 – Ehrensperger
Stewart (Dawes) – 52:57	6 – 2
Crosby (Phaneuf, Stewart) – 59:46	7 – 2

6 min
Penalties
6 min
42
Shots
23

December 28, 2003; 18:30	Finland	3–2 (0–2, 1–0, 2–0)	Czech Republic	Hämeenlinna; Attendance: 4,418

Game reference

Konstantin Barulin
Goalies
Joakim Lundström
Referee:
(Russia) Sergej Karabanov
Linesmen:
(Russia) Konstantin Gordenko
(United States) Allen Stensland

	0 – 1	Olesz (Hudler, Chvátal) – 12:36
	0 – 2	Olesz (Kašpar) – 17:42
39:32 – Töykkälä	1 – 2
40:17 – PP1 – Lepisto (Salmela, Filppula)	2 – 2
55:40 – Filppula (Bergenheim)	3 – 2

39 min
Penalties
20 min
35
Shots
24

December 29, 2003; 18:30	Ukraine	0–10 (0–3, 0–6, 0–1)	Canada	Helsinki; Attendance: 992

Game reference

Yevgeniy Galyuk
Illia Tarankov
Goalies
Josh Harding
Referee:
Vladimír Šindler
Linesmen:
(United States) Allen Stensland
(Norway) Thomas Gienke

0 – 1	00:33 – Carter (Burns)
0 – 2	01:17 – Stewart (Richards, Seabrook)
0 – 3	14:17 – PP1 – Seabrook (Getzlaf, Gorges)
0 – 4	23:10 – Tambellini (Dixon)
0 – 5	28:25 – Crosby (Tambellini)
0 – 6	29:54 – Dawes (Carter, Stewart)
0 – 7	32:05 – Brent (Talbot)
0 – 8	32:56 – Dawes (Gorges)
0 – 9	37:12 – PP1 – Paille (Talbot, Brent)
0 – 10	54:50 – PP1 – Paille (Tambellini, Belle)

14 min
Penalties
8 min
11
Shots
55

December 30, 2003; 16:00	Switzerland	1–2 (1–1, 0–0, 0–1)	Czech Republic	Helsinki

Game reference

December 30, 2003; 19:30	Ukraine	1–14 (0–4, 1–4, 0–6)	Finland	Helsinki; Attendance: 4,271

Game reference

Illia Tarankov
Goalies
Mikael Vuorio
Referee:
(Slovakia) Peter Ország
Linesmen:
(Germany) Christian Neubert
(Slovakia) Miroslav Halecký

	0 – 1	05:50 – Tukonen (Oksa)
	0 – 2	11:13 – Kontiola (Tukonen)
	0 – 3	12:34 – Lepistö (Filppula, Bergenheim)
	0 – 4	18:16 – Lepistö (Immonen, Marjamäki)
	0 – 5	20:59 – PP1 – Immonen (Kantee)
	0 – 6	29:31 – Jalasvaara (Töykkälä)
Lubnin (Katrych, Kyrychenko) – PP1 – 32:31	1 – 6
	1 – 7	38:26 – PP2 – Filppula (Varakas, Bergenheim)
	1 – 8	39:13 – PP2 – Lepistö (Salmela)
	1 – 9	43:43 – Salmela (Töykkälä, Immonen)
	1 – 10	48:59 – SH1 – Filppula
	1 – 11	51:18 – PP1 – Bergenheim (Lepistö)
	1 – 12	53:28 – Piispanen (Nurmi)
	1 – 13	54:11 – Immonen (Varakas)
	1 – 14	59:41 – Nurmi (Kalteva)

14 min
Penalties
10 min
15
Shots
60

December 31, 2003; 16:00	Czech Republic	2–5 (0–3, 1–2, 1–0)	Canada	Helsinki; Attendance: 2,816

Game reference

Marek Schwarz
Tomáš Pöpperle
Goalies
Marc-André Fleury
Referee:
(Sweden) Thomas Andersson
Linesmen:
(Sweden) Mikael Ljungqvist
(United States) Allen Stensland

	0 – 1	06:53 – Tambellini (Crosby)
	0 – 2	16:01 – Carter (Getzlaf, Burns)
	0 – 3	19:30 – PP2 – Dawes (Stewart, Meech)
	0 – 4	29:59 – PP1 – Phaneuf (Getzlaf)
Ovčáčík (Kanko, Koreis) – 34:47	1 – 4
	1 – 5	39:41 – Carter (Phaneuf)
Šmíd (Hudler) – PP1 – 50:18	2 – 5

12 min
Penalties
24 min
29
Shots
30

December 31, 2003; 19:30	Finland	2–0 (1–0, 0–0, 1–0)	Switzerland	Helsinki; Attendance: 3,680

Game reference
Hannu Toivonen	Goalies	Michael Tobler	Referee: (Germany) Wilhelm Schimm; Linesmen: (Russia) Konstantin Gordenko (Slovakia) Miroslav Halecký
Nokelainen (Filppula) – 19:11 / 1 – 0; Junnila (Varakas) – 55:37 / 2 – 0			Referee: (Germany) Wilhelm Schimm; Linesmen: (Russia) Konstantin Gordenko (Slovakia) Miroslav Halecký
2 min	Penalties	4 min	Referee: (Germany) Wilhelm Schimm; Linesmen: (Russia) Konstantin Gordenko (Slovakia) Miroslav Halecký
40	Shots	8	Referee: (Germany) Wilhelm Schimm; Linesmen: (Russia) Konstantin Gordenko (Slovakia) Miroslav Halecký

=== Relegation round ===
Results from any games played during the preliminary round were carried forward to the relegation round.

Pos	Team	Pld	W	D	L	GF	GA	GD	Pts	Relegation
1	Sweden	3	3	0	0	15	3	+12	6	
2	Switzerland	3	2	0	1	20	6	+14	4	
3	Austria	3	0	1	2	4	15	−11	1	Relegated to the 2005 Division I
4	Ukraine	3	0	1	2	2	17	−15	1	Relegated to the 2005 Division I

(all games at Hämeenlinna)

==== January 2 ====
- Sweden 4–0 Ukraine
- Switzerland 6–2 Austria

==== January 3 ====
- Austria 2–2 Ukraine
- Sweden 4–3 Switzerland

=== Playoff round ===
Quarterfinals
B2	Finland	4
A3	Russia	3
A2	Slovakia	2
B3	Czech Republic	4

Semifinals
A1	United States	2
B2	Finland	1
B1	Canada	7
B3	Czech Republic	1

Final
A1	United States	4
B1	Canada	3
Third place
B2	Finland	2
B3	Czech Republic	1

==== Quarterfinals ====
2 January 2004; 16:00	Slovakia	2–4 (1–1, 1–3, 0–0)	Czech Republic	Helsinki Ice Arena, Helsinki; Attendance: 4,502

Game reference
12 min	Penalties	14 min
32	Shots	47

2 January 2004; 20:00	Finland	4–3 (1–1, 1–1, 2–1)	Russia	Helsinki Ice Arena, Helsinki; Attendance: 5,720

Game reference
8 min	Penalties	12 min
36	Shots	22

==== Semifinals ====
3 January 2004; 15:00	Canada	7–1 (2–1, 1–0, 4–0)	Czech Republic	Helsinki Ice Arena, Helsinki; Attendance: 4,911

Game reference
35 min	Penalties	10 min
34	Shots	16

3 January 2004; 19:00	United States	2–1 (1–0, 0–0, 1–1)	Finland	Helsinki Ice Arena, Helsinki; Attendance: 6,965

Game reference
10 min	Penalties	8 min
29	Shots	26

==== Fifth place game ====
4 January 2004; 15:00	Russia	3–2 (0–0, 2–1, 1–1)	Slovakia	Helsinki Ice Arena, Helsinki; Attendance: 1,940

Game reference
33 min	Penalties	14 min
28	Shots	21

==== Bronze medal game ====
5 January 2004; 15:00	Czech Republic	1–2 (0–0, 1–0, 0–2)	Finland	Helsinki Ice Arena, Helsinki

Game reference
10 min	Penalties	4 min
17	Shots	30

==== Final ====
5 January 2004; 19:00	Canada	3–4 (1–1, 2–0, 0–3)	United States	Helsinki Ice Arena, Helsinki; Attendance: 7,364

Game reference
6 min	Penalties	6 min
30	Shots	28

The victory gave the United States its first WJC gold medal ever, and its first medal since a silver medal in 1997 when it lost 2–0 to Canada in the final.

=== Scoring leaders ===
Pos	Player	Country	GP	G	A	Pts
1	Nigel Dawes	Canada	6	6	5	11
2	Zach Parise	United States	6	5	6	11
2	Anthony Stewart	Canada	6	5	6	11
4	Valtteri Filppula	Finland	7	4	5	9
5	Sami Lepistö	Finland	7	4	4	8
6	Patrik Bärtschi	Switzerland	6	3	5	8
7	Sergei Anshakov	Russia	6	5	2	7
7	Jeff Carter	Canada	6	5	2	7
7	Gianni Ehrensperger	Switzerland	6	5	2	7
7	Alexander Ovechkin	Russia	6	5	2	7

GP = Games played; G = Goals; A = Assists; Pts = Points; +/− = Plus-minus; PIM = Penalties In Minutes

=== Goaltending leaders ===
Minimum 40% of team's ice time.

Rank	Player	Country	TOI	SOG	GA	GAA	Saves	Sv %	SO
1	Al Montoya	United States	360:00	144	8	1.33	136	94.44	2
2	Joakim Lundström	Sweden	299:08	105	7	1.40	98	93.33	1
3	Denis Khudyakov	Russia	160:00	58	4	1.50	54	93.10	0
4	Jaroslav Halák	Slovakia	360:00	194	14	2.33	180	92.78	2
5	Hannu Toivonen	Finland	357:25	137	11	1.85	126	91.97	1

=== Tournament awards ===
	IIHF Directorate Awards	Media All-Star Team
Goaltender	(United States) Al Montoya	(United States) Al Montoya
Defencemen	(Finland) Sami Lepistö	(Canada) Dion Phaneuf (Finland) Sami Lepistö
Forwards	(United States) Zach Parise	(Finland) Valtteri Filppula (Canada) Jeff Carter (United States) Zach Parise

==== Most Valuable Player ====
(United States) Zach Parise

=== Final standings ===
	Team
1st place, gold medalist(s)	United States
2nd place, silver medalist(s)	Canada
3rd place, bronze medalist(s)	Finland
4	Czech Republic
5	Russia
6	Slovakia
7	Sweden
8	Switzerland
9	Austria
10	Ukraine

== Division I ==
The Division I Championships were played on December 14–20, 2003 in Berlin, Germany (Group A) and on December 13–19, 2003 in Briançon, France (Group B).

=== Group A ===
Pos	Team	Pld	W	D	L	GF	GA	GD	Pts	Promotion or relegation
1	Germany	5	3	2	0	29	10	+19	8	Promoted to the 2005 Top Division
2	Denmark	5	3	1	1	23	16	+7	7	
3	Slovenia	5	3	0	2	18	19	−1	6	
4	Latvia	5	2	2	1	35	19	+16	6	
5	Kazakhstan	5	1	1	3	16	19	−3	3	
6	Hungary	5	0	0	5	8	46	−38	0	Relegated to the 2005 Division II

Source: IIHF

=== Group B ===
Pos	Team	Pld	W	D	L	GF	GA	GD	Pts	Promotion or relegation
1	Belarus	5	5	0	0	34	11	+23	10	Promoted to the 2005 Top Division
2	Norway	5	3	0	2	21	10	+11	6	
3	France	5	3	0	2	22	16	+6	6	
4	Italy	5	3	0	2	15	18	−3	6	
5	Estonia	5	1	0	4	9	33	−24	2	
6	Japan	5	0	0	5	9	22	−13	0	Relegated to the 2005 Division II

== Division II ==
The Division II Championships were played on December 28, 2003 – January 3, 2004 in Sosnowiec, Poland (Group A) and on January 5–11, 2004 in Kaunas and Elektrėnai, Lithuania (Group B).

=== Group A ===
Pos	Team	Pld	W	D	L	GF	GA	GD	Pts	Promotion or relegation
1	Poland	5	5	0	0	59	4	+55	10	Promoted to the 2005 Division I
2	Romania	5	3	1	1	44	16	+28	7	
3	Netherlands	5	3	0	2	32	19	+13	6	
4	Spain	5	2	1	2	21	32	−11	5	
5	Belgium	5	1	0	4	16	31	−15	2	
6	Iceland	5	0	0	5	10	80	−70	0	Relegated to the 2005 Division III

=== Group B ===
Pos	Team	Pld	W	D	L	GF	GA	GD	Pts	Promotion or relegation
1	Great Britain	5	5	0	0	38	5	+33	10	Promoted to the 2005 Division I
2	South Korea	5	4	0	1	45	7	+38	8	
3	Croatia	5	2	0	3	18	18	0	4	
4	Serbia and Montenegro	5	2	0	3	15	21	−6	4	
5	Lithuania	5	2	0	3	12	25	−13	4	
6	South Africa	5	0	0	5	4	56	−52	0	Relegated to the 2005 Division III

== Division III ==
The Division III Championship was played on January 5–11, 2004 in Sofia, Bulgaria.

Pos	Team	Pld	W	D	L	GF	GA	GD	Pts	Promotion
1	Australia	5	5	0	0	42	13	+29	10	Promoted to the 2005 Division II
2	China	5	4	0	1	41	10	+31	8	Promoted to the 2005 Division II
3	Mexico	5	3	0	2	25	16	+9	6	
4	Turkey	5	1	0	4	10	38	−28	2	
5	Bulgaria	5	1	0	4	13	34	−21	2	
6	New Zealand	5	1	0	4	10	30	−20	2	

Source: IIHF

Preceded by 2003 World Juniors	World Junior Ice Hockey Championships See also: 2004 World Championships	Succeeded by 2005 World Juniors
