= Elisabetta Dessy =

Italian model, actress, and swimmer

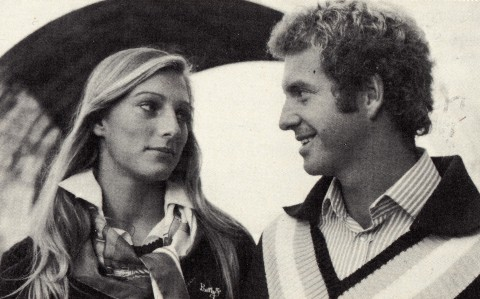
- Dessy with her then-husband Klaus Dibiasi, early 1980s
- Born: 28 November 1957 (age 68); Rome, Italy
- Spouse: Klaus Dibiasi (m. 1980, annulled)
- Modeling information
- Height: 1.80 m (5 ft 11 in)
- Hair color: Blonde
- Eye color: Blue
- Agencies: Mirrrs Models (Germany); Women 360 management (USA); Women 360 Paris (France); Models1 (London); and others
- Sports career
- Nationality: Italian
- Height: 1.80 m (5 ft 11 in)
- Weight: 58 kg (128 lb; 9.1 st)
- Sport: Swimming
- Strokes: Freestyle
- Club: C.C. Aniene
- Coach: Celio Brunelleschi
Medal record
Event	1st	2nd	3rd
Mediterranean Games	1	0	1

Elisabetta "Betty" Dessy (born 28 November 1957) is an Italian model and actress who competed as a swimmer in the 1976 Summer Olympics.

== Biography ==
Elisabetta Dessy was born in Rome, Italy. She is the first of four children born to countess Amalia Acqua and her husband Giorgio Dessy, an Air Force captain.

She was a member of the National swimming team from 1971 to 1976. Dessy competed in the 100 m breaststroke and 100 m freestyle at the 1974 European Aquatics Championships. She was part of the National team during the Latin Swimming Cup in Marseille 1974, Las Palmas 1975 and Acapulco 1976; she also competed in the Five Nations Swimming Championships between 1973 and 1976 in Järfälla, Minsk, Erfurt and Nice.

Elisabetta Dessy was on the 4 × 100 m freestyle relay team that won the gold medal at the Mediterranean Games in 1975 in Algiers, and won the bronze medal in the 100 m freestyle.

As captain of the Italian Swimming team, she took part in the 4 × 100 m mixed relay during the Olympic Games in Montreal in 1976, setting the new Italian record during the semifinals. She was Italian Champion of the 100 m freestyle in 1974, 1975 and 1976, in the 4 × 100 m freestyle relay in 1972 and 1973, and in the mixed relay 4 x 100 m.

== Modeling career ==
After the 1976 Summer Olympics Dessy worked as a runway model in Milan, Paris and New York for designers including Valentino, Gucci, Gianni Versace, Armani, Fendi, Emilio Pucci, Salvatore Ferragamo, Roberto Capucci, Irene Galitzine, Missoni and Brioni.

She also appeared in the jewelry advertising campaigns for Tiffany & Co. and Van Cleef & Arpels.

In 1982 she starred alongside Vic Morrow and Fred Williamson in Enzo G Castellari's film 1990: The Bronx Warriors as Witch.

Elisabetta Dessy returned to modeling after 40 years, for Valentino and Maison Margiela. She also starred in the advertising campaigns of Mango, Tod's, Farfetch and Brunello Cucinelli.

In 2023, she also appeared on the cover of Italian Marie Claire's April issue by Henrik Blomqvist with Fendi and on the cover of Italian and French Vanity Fair's September issue by Luigi and Iango alongside supermodels Naomi, Claudia Schiffer, Helena Christensen, Amber Valletta, Carla Bruni and Iman.
