= Parise =

Parise is a surname of Italian origin. Notable people with this name include:

- Eddy Parise, bass player for the Australian band Baby Animals
- Goffredo Parise (1929–1986), Italian writer, journalist, and screenwriter
- J. P. Parisé (1941–2015), Canadian ice hockey player
- Jordan Parise, American ice hockey player
- Ronald A. Parise, American scientist and astronaut
- Sara Parise, Italian swimmer
- Vanessa Parise, film director
- Zach Parise, American hockey player

== See also ==
- Parisse, a surname
