= Parisse =

Parisse /pæˈriːs/ is a surname. Notable people with the surname include:

- Annie Parisse (born Anne Marie Cancelmi, 1975), American actor
- Clément Parisse (born 1993), French cross-country skier
- Sergio Parisse (born 1983), Italian rugby player
- Tony Parisse (1911–56), American baseball player

== See also ==
- Parise, a surname
