= Dmitri Pestunov =

Russian ice hockey player

- Born: January 22, 1985 (age 41) Ust-Kamenogorsk, Kazakh SSR, Soviet Union
- Height: 5 ft 10 in (178 cm)
- Weight: 212 lb (96 kg; 15 st 2 lb)
- Position: Forward
- Shot: Left
- Played for: Metallurg Magnitogorsk; Spartak Moscow; Avangard Omsk; Dynamo Moscow; Traktor Chelyabinsk; Avtomobilist Yekaterinburg
- NHL draft: 80th overall, 2003; Phoenix Coyotes
- Playing career: 2002–2022

Dmitry Pestunov (born January 22, 1985) is a Russian former ice hockey player. He was selected by Phoenix Coyotes in the 3rd round (80th overall) of the 2003 NHL entry draft.

== Playing career ==
Pestunov was traded during the 2014–15 season by HC Dynamo Moscow in a return to Chelyabinsk on October 27, 2014.

== Career statistics ==
=== Regular season and playoffs ===
			Regular season					Playoffs
Season	Team	League	GP	G	A	Pts	PIM	GP	G	A	Pts	PIM
2001–02	Metallurg–2 Magnitogorsk	RUS.3	16	8	8	16	8	—	—	—	—	—
2002–03	Metallurg Magnitogorsk	RSL	32	4	0	4	0	—	—	—	—	—
2002–03	Metallurg–2 Magnitogorsk	RUS.3	13	2	8	10	16	—	—	—	—	—
2003–04	Metallurg Magnitogorsk	RSL	50	6	7	13	40	14	0	3	3	25
2004–05	Metallurg Magnitogorsk	RSL	37	4	4	8	46	—	—	—	—	—
2004–05	Metallurg–2 Magnitogorsk	RUS.3	15	9	13	22	30	—	—	—	—	—
2004–05	Spartak Moscow	RSL	12	1	1	2	14	—	—	—	—	—
2005–06	Metallurg Magnitogorsk	RSL	48	6	13	19	58	4	0	1	1	0
2006–07	Metallurg Magnitogorsk	RSL	53	5	18	23	26	11	0	0	0	8
2007–08	Spartak Moscow	RSL	51	8	17	25	56	5	0	0	0	16
2008–09	Avangard Omsk	KHL	56	7	34	41	58	9	0	3	3	16
2009–10	Avangard Omsk	KHL	48	5	18	23	30	2	0	0	0	0
2010–11	Traktor Chelyabinsk	KHL	43	6	11	17	46	—	—	—	—	—
2010–11	Dynamo Moscow	KHL	10	3	2	5	4	6	1	1	2	2
2011–12	Dynamo Moscow	KHL	30	2	7	9	38	21	1	7	8	8
2012–13	Dynamo Moscow	KHL	39	4	6	10	34	13	1	2	3	2
2013–14	Dynamo Moscow	KHL	47	2	11	13	18	7	0	2	2	6
2014–15	Dynamo Moscow	KHL	8	2	0	2	2	—	—	—	—	—
2014–15	Traktor Chelyabinsk	KHL	39	5	18	23	32	6	0	2	2	39
2015–16	Traktor Chelyabinsk	KHL	53	5	13	18	32	—	—	—	—	—
2016–17	Traktor Chelyabinsk	KHL	60	11	13	24	40	6	1	2	3	10
2017–18	Avtomobilist Yekaterinburg	KHL	29	2	3	5	12	—	—	—	—	—
2018–19	CS Progym Gheorgheni	EL	46	5	34	39	69	7	2	3	5	16
2018–19	CS Progym Gheorgheni	ROU	23	8	20	28	39	4	1	2	3	4
2019–20	CS Progym Gheorgheni	EL	34	4	16	20	28	2	1	0	1	4
2019–20	CS Progym Gheorgheni	ROU	28	10	31	41	32	—	—	—	—	—
2020–21	Debreceni Hoki Klub	EL	35	5	16	21	—	5	1	1	2	—
2021–22	Shakhtyor Soligorsk	BLR	35	4	12	16	18	—	—	—	—	—
2021–22	HK Liepāja	LAT	11	4	6	10	4	—	—	—	—	—
RSL totals			283	34	60	94	240	34	0	4	4	49
KHL totals			462	54	136	190	346	70	4	19	23	83

=== International ===
Year	Team	Event	GP	G	A	Pts	PIM
2003	Russia	WJC	6	0	0	0	6
2003	Russia	WJC18	6	1	3	4	2
2004	Russia	WJC	6	0	2	2	16
2005	Russia	WJC	6	2	2	4	2
Junior totals			24	3	7	10	26
