= Sami Lepistö =

Finnish ice hockey player (born 1984)

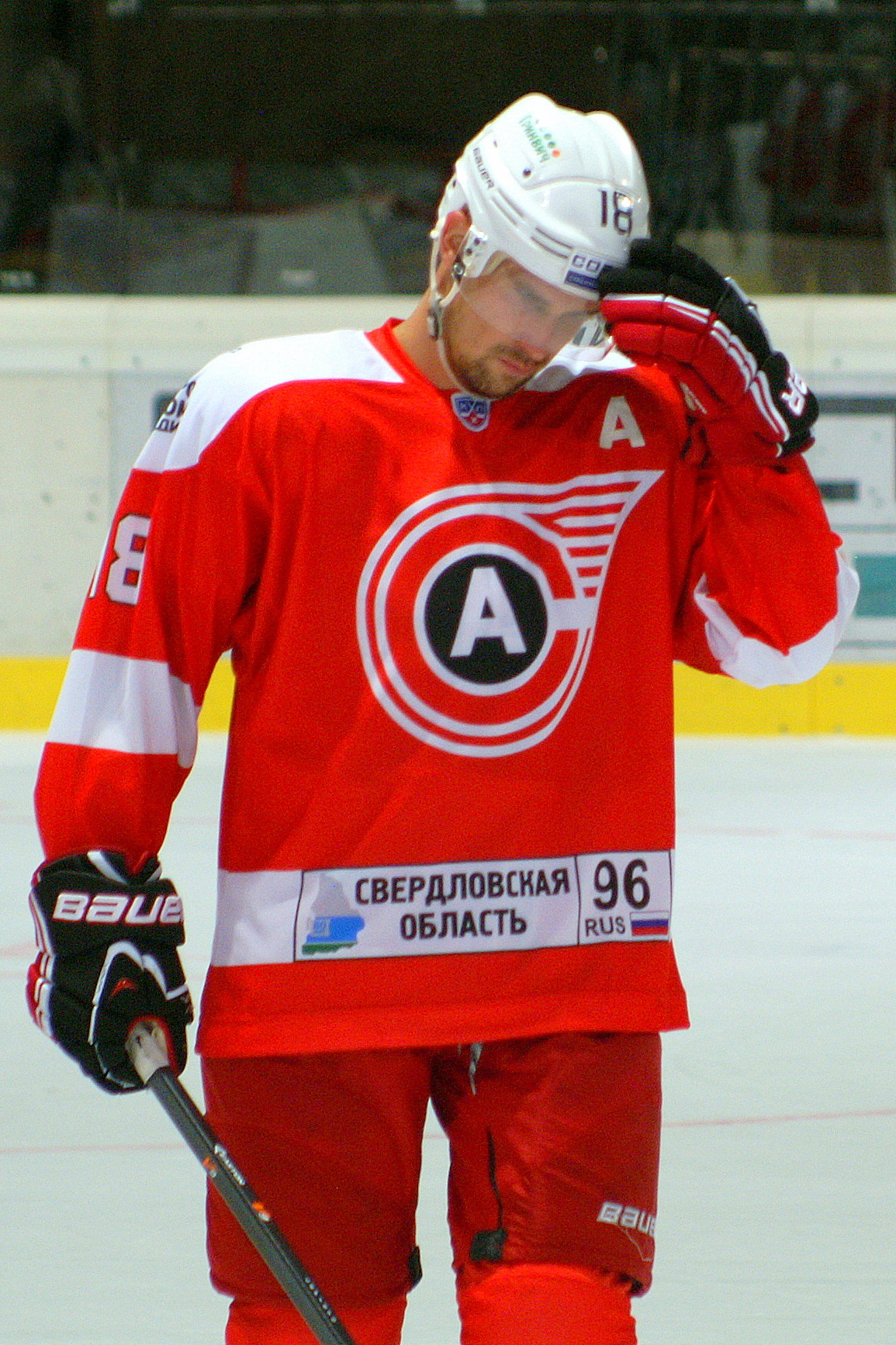
- Born: 17 October 1984 (age 41) Espoo, Finland
- Height: 6 ft 1 in (185 cm)
- Weight: 194 lb (88 kg; 13 st 12 lb)
- Position: Defence
- Shot: Left
- NL team Former teams: SCL Tigers; Jokerit; Washington Capitals; Phoenix Coyotes; Columbus Blue Jackets; Chicago Blackhawks; Lokomotiv Yaroslavl; Lev Prague; Avtomobilist Yekaterinburg; Salavat Yulaev Ufa; Luleå HF
- National team: Finland
- NHL draft: 66th overall, 2004; Washington Capitals
- Playing career: 2003–2023

Sami Lepistö (born 17 October 1984) is a Finnish former professional ice hockey defenceman. He is the son of former Jokerit captain and youth international defenceman Jussi Lepistö. Sami was drafted by the Washington Capitals in the third round, 66th overall, in the 2004 NHL entry draft.

== Playing career ==
=== Jokerit ===
Lepistö played professional hockey for Jokerit in the Finnish SM-liiga. In 2003–04, his first season, Lepistö had 3 goals and 7 points in 53 games, followed by one assist in eight playoff games for Jokerit. He also played for Finland in the 2004 World Junior Ice Hockey Championships, scoring four goals and eight points in seven games. Lepistö saw his offensive numbers rise in 2004–05, as he had 7 goals and 25 points in 55 games. Lepistö also had a solid playoff performance for Jokerit, scoring 1 goal and 8 points in 12 games.

Lepistö returned to Jokerit in 2005–06 and increased his offensive numbers once again, scoring 8 goals and 29 points in 56 games. However, he had an injury plagued 2006–07 season, as he had 1 goal and 10 points in 26 games. On 31 May 2007, Lepistö signed a two-year, entry-level contract with the Washington Capitals.

=== NHL ===
Lepistö was sent to the Hershey Bears of the American Hockey League (AHL) in 2007–08, where in 55 games, he scored 4 goals and 45 points as well as posting a solid +29 rating. Lepistö also made his NHL debut on 16 February 2008 with the Capitals. In seven games with Washington in 2007–08, he had one assist. He was returned to Hershey, where he had an assist in five playoff games. After the season, Lepistö played for Finland at the 2008 IIHF World Championship, where he had one goal and one assist in seven games.

Lepistö spent most of the 2008–09 season with Hershey once again, scoring 4 goals and 42 points in 70 games and recording a +24 rating. He once again appeared in seven games with the Capitals, where Lepistö earned four assists. On 27 June 2009, Lepistö was traded to the Phoenix Coyotes for the Coyotes' fifth-round pick in the 2010 NHL entry draft.

Lepistö spent the entire 2009–10 season with the Phoenix Coyotes, where he scored 1 goal and 11 points in 66 games, helping the club to the 2010 playoffs. In seven playoff games with the Coyotes, Lepistö scored one goal. He also played for Finland at the 2010 Winter Olympics, where he recorded one assist in six games. He returned to the Coyotes for the 2010–11 season, where he had 4 goals and 11 points in 51 games.

On 28 February 2011, the Coyotes traded Lepistö and Scottie Upshall to the Columbus Blue Jackets in exchange for Rostislav Klesla and Dane Byers. On 15 July 2011, Lepistö signed a one-year contract with the Chicago Blackhawks.

=== KHL ===
On 4 June 2012, it was announced Lepistö had signed a one-year contract to play for the rebuilding Lokomotiv Yaroslavl of the Kontinental Hockey League (KHL).

On 12 January 2013, Lepistö was traded to Lev Prague of the KHL. In the summer of 2013, he signed a two-year contract with Avtomobilist Yekaterinburg. After that, he signed a one-year contract with Salavat Yulaev Ufa. During the 2016 playoffs, he tied Nikita Zaitsev and Chris Lee to lead all defenceman in playoff scoring with 13 points.

After two seasons with Ufa, it was announced Lepistö as a free agent would return to play for original club Jokerit, now competing in the KHL on 22 May 2017.

=== After KHL ===
For the 2021–22 season, Lepistö joined Luleå HF in the Swedish Hockey League, followed by a year in SCL Tigers of Swiss National League. He signed a contract for 2023–2024 with HIFK in the Finnish Liiga, but he was forced to end his career before the season start due to an aortic aneurysm found in his heart that proved continuing contact sports risky.

== Career statistics ==
=== Regular season and playoffs ===
			Regular season					Playoffs
Season	Team	League	GP	G	A	Pts	PIM	GP	G	A	Pts	PIM
1999–2000	Jokerit	FIN U16	14	3	9	12	22	7	1	3	4	16
2000–01	Jokerit	FIN U16	12	1	10	11	26	2	0	0	0	2
2001–02	Jokerit	FIN U18	20	8	14	22	36	8	4	8	12	12
2001–02	Jokerit	FIN U20	14	0	5	5	2	—	—	—	—	—
2002–03	Jokerit	FIN U20	36	5	14	19	34	11	1	5	6	8
2003–04	Jokerit	SM-l	53	3	4	7	20	8	0	1	1	4
2004–05	Jokerit	SM-l	55	7	18	25	44	12	1	7	8	12
2005–06	Jokerit	SM-l	56	8	21	27	68	—	—	—	—	—
2006–07	Jokerit	SM-l	26	1	9	10	32	10	2	2	4	4
2007–08	Hershey Bears	AHL	55	4	41	45	51	5	0	1	1	4
2007–08	Washington Capitals	NHL	7	0	1	1	12	—	—	—	—	—
2008–09	Hershey Bears	AHL	70	4	38	42	80	—	—	—	—	—
2008–09	Washington Capitals	NHL	7	0	4	4	6	—	—	—	—	—
2009–10	Phoenix Coyotes	NHL	66	1	10	11	60	7	1	0	1	6
2010–11	Phoenix Coyotes	NHL	51	4	7	11	37	—	—	—	—	—
2010–11	Columbus Blue Jackets	NHL	19	0	5	5	18	—	—	—	—	—
2011–12	Chicago Blackhawks	NHL	26	1	2	3	4	3	0	0	0	0
2012–13	Lokomotiv Yaroslavl	KHL	26	0	3	3	30	—	—	—	—	—
2012–13	Lev Prague	KHL	11	0	5	5	20	3	0	0	0	2
2013–14	Avtomobilist Yekaterinburg	KHL	53	6	19	25	67	4	1	1	2	6
2014–15	Avtomobilist Yekaterinburg	KHL	60	7	16	23	44	5	0	1	1	4
2015–16	Salavat Yulaev Ufa	KHL	60	11	19	30	33	19	6	7	13	16
2016–17	Salavat Yulaev Ufa	KHL	53	6	25	31	22	5	0	3	3	4
2017–18	Jokerit	KHL	56	7	22	29	34	11	0	7	7	8
2018–19	Jokerit	KHL	59	8	28	36	65	6	0	3	3	0
2019–20	Jokerit	KHL	61	8	17	25	58	6	1	2	3	2
2020–21	Jokerit	KHL	27	1	7	8	18	4	1	0	1	6
2021–22	Luleå HF	SHL	39	4	25	29	24	17	2	13	15	20
2022–23	SCL Tigers	NL	52	5	15	20	34	—	—	—	—	—
SM-l totals			190	19	52	71	164	30	3	10	13	20
NHL totals			176	6	29	35	137	10	1	0	1	6
KHL totals			466	54	161	215	391	63	9	24	33	48

=== International ===
Medal record

Representing Finland

Ice hockey

Olympic Games
Bronze medal – third place	2010 Vancouver	
Bronze medal – third place	2014 Sochi	

World Championships
Gold medal – first place	2011 Slovakia	
Bronze medal – third place	2008 Canada	

World Junior Championships
Bronze medal – third place	2004 Finland	

Year	Team	Event	Result	GP	G	A	Pts	PIM
2004	Finland	WJC	3rd place, bronze medalist(s)	7	4	4	8	10
2008	Finland	WC	3rd place, bronze medalist(s)	7	1	1	2	10
2010	Finland	OG	3rd place, bronze medalist(s)	6	0	1	1	6
2011	Finland	WC	1st place, gold medalist(s)	9	0	3	3	6
2013	Finland	WC	4th	10	0	4	4	2
2014	Finland	OG	3rd place, bronze medalist(s)	6	1	1	2	0
2015	Finland	WC	6th	8	0	2	2	4
2016	Finland	WCH	8th	3	0	0	0	2
2018	Finland	OG	6th	5	2	3	5	4
Junior totals				7	4	4	8	10
Senior totals				54	4	15	19	34

== Awards and honours ==
Award	Year
AHL
Calder Cup champion	2009
International
WJC Best Defenceman	2004
WJC All-Star Team	2004
