= Aleksei Shkotov =

- Born: June 22, 1984 (age 42) Elektrostal, Russian SFSR, Soviet Union
- Height: 5 ft 11 in (180 cm)
- Weight: 161 lb (73 kg; 11 st 7 lb)
- Position: Centre
- Shot: Left
- Played for: HC CSKA Moscow; Worcester IceCats; Khimik Voskresensk; Khimik Mytishchi; Salavat Yulaev Ufa; HC Sibir Novosibirsk; HC Spartak Moscow
- National team: Russia
- NHL draft: 48th overall, 2002; St. Louis Blues
- Playing career: 2002–2014

Alexei Shkotov (born June 22, 1984) is a Russian former professional ice hockey player.

Shkotov was drafted 48th overall by the St. Louis Blues in the 2002 NHL entry draft. He joined the Blues organization in 2004 during the locked-out 2004-05 season and played for the Worcester IceCats of the American Hockey League. He played just 23 games for the IceCats before returning to Russia.

== Career statistics ==
=== Regular season and playoffs ===
			Regular season					Playoffs
Season	Team	League	GP	G	A	Pts	PIM	GP	G	A	Pts	PIM
1999–2000	Kristall–2 Elektrostal	RUS.3	2	0	0	0	0	—	—	—	—	—
2000–01	Elemash–2 Elektrostal	RUS.3	16	11	4	15	14	—	—	—	—	—
2001–02	Elemash Elektrostal	RUS.2	52	18	9	27	40	—	—	—	—	—
2001–02	Elemash–2 Elektrostal	RUS.3	4	4	5	9	2	—	—	—	—	—
2002–03	CSKA Moscow	RSL	33	5	1	6	20	—	—	—	—	—
2002–03	CSKA–2 Moscow	RUS.3	10	9	13	22	4	—	—	—	—	—
2003–04	Moncton Wildcats	QMJHL	7	2	4	6	2	—	—	—	—	—
2003–04	Quebec Remparts	QMJHL	36	25	36	61	24	5	3	1	4	4
2004–05	Worcester IceCats	AHL	23	6	6	12	18	—	—	—	—	—
2004–05	Khimik Voskresensk	RSL	21	6	1	7	8	—	—	—	—	—
2005–06	Khimik Moscow Oblast	RSL	32	6	10	16	34	9	0	3	3	8
2005–06	Kristall Elektrostal	RUS.3	2	1	1	2	0	—	—	—	—	—
2006–07	Khimik Moscow Oblast	RSL	13	2	4	6	8	—	—	—	—	—
2006–07	Khimik–2 Moscow Oblast	RUS.3	2	0	1	1	4	—	—	—	—	—
2006–07	Salavat Yulaev Ufa	RSL	19	4	1	5	28	6	2	1	3	4
2007–08	Salavat Yulaev Ufa	RSL	26	5	3	8	14	13	1	1	2	4
2008–09	Salavat Yulaev Ufa	KHL	1	0	0	0	0	—	—	—	—	—
2009–10	Sibir Novosibirsk	KHL	9	2	0	2	6	—	—	—	—	—
2009–10	Kristall Elektrostal	RUS.3	15	15	16	31	18	—	—	—	—	—
2009–10	Spartak Moscow	KHL	16	2	2	4	2	10	1	3	4	2
2010–11	Spartak Moscow	KHL	31	2	10	12	8	3	0	1	1	0
2012–13	Kristall Elektrostal	RUS.3	28	13	15	28	54	3	2	3	5	14
2013–14	Kristall Elektrostal	RUS.3	15	2	13	15	53	3	0	1	1	4
RUS.3 totals			94	55	68	123	149	6	2	4	6	18
RSL totals			144	28	20	48	112	28	3	5	8	16
KHL totals			57	6	12	18	16	13	1	4	5	2

=== International ===
Year	Team	Event	GP	G	A	Pts	PIM
2002	Russia	WJC18	8	2	4	6	12
2004	Russia	WJC	6	2	2	4	4
Junior totals			14	4	6	10	16
