= Johan A. Andersson =

Swedish professional ice hockey forward

Johan Andersson
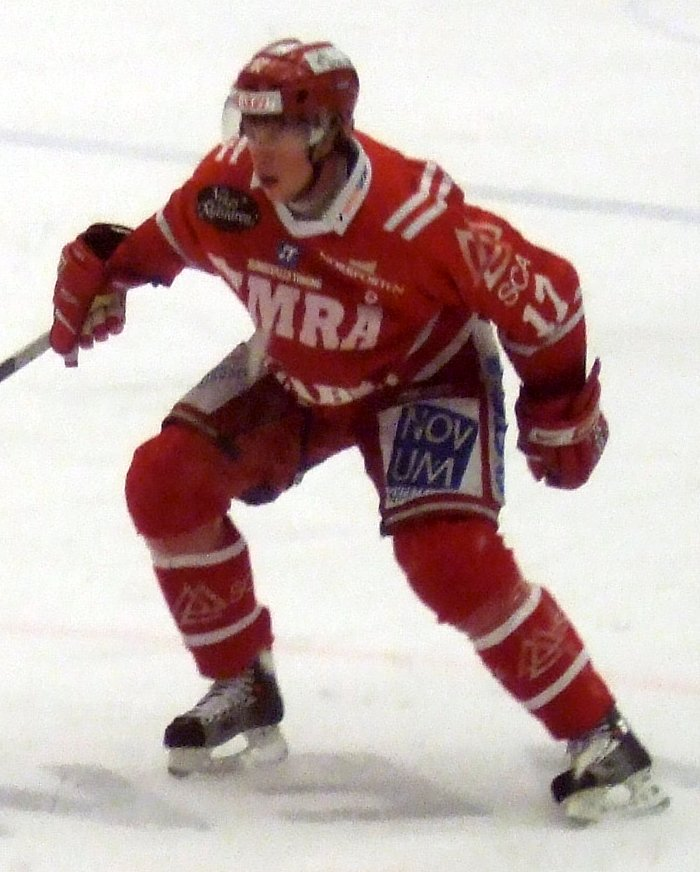
- Born: May 18, 1984 (age 41) Motala, Sweden
- Height: 6 ft 0 in (183 cm)
- Weight: 205 lb (93 kg; 14 st 9 lb)
- Position: Centre
- Shot: Left
- HockeyAllsvenskan team Former teams: IF Troja/Ljungby; SEL; Färjestad BK; Linköpings HC; Timrå IK
- National team: Sweden
- NHL draft: 181st overall, 2003; Chicago Blackhawks
- Playing career: 2001–2014, 2019

Johan Anders Andersson (born May 18, 1984) is a Swedish professional ice hockey forward. He is currently playing for IF Troja/Ljungby in HockeyAllsvenskan.

== Career ==
Andersson was born in Motala but grew up in Ljungby. His professional career began with the HockeyAllsvenskan team IF Troja/Ljungby, his youth team, in the 2000–01 season. Showing great offensive skills, he was drafted in the 2003 NHL entry draft by the Chicago Blackhawks in the sixth round as 181st overall. He was then elected to the Swedish national junior team for the 2004 World Junior Ice Hockey Championships.

In the 2004–05 season, he made his first appearance in the top Swedish league, Elitserien (SEL), with the Linköpings HC. His statistics were underwhelming, and after two seasons with Linköping, he signed with Timrå IK ahead of the 2006–07 season. Showing significant improvement, he scored 9 goals and 25 points during the 2006–07 season. On April 9, 2009, he left Timrå and signed with Färjestad BK. In April 2010, he returned to Linköpings HC. He left Linköping after one year, returning to Timrå IK ahead of the 2011–12 season.

== Career statistics ==
=== Regular season and playoffs ===
			Regular season					Playoffs
Season	Team	League	GP	G	A	Pts	PIM	GP	G	A	Pts	PIM
2000–01	IF Troja/Ljungby	Allsv	3	0	0	0	0	—	—	—	—	—
2001–02	IF Troja/Ljungby	Allsv	42	2	0	2	10	5	0	2	2	2
2002–03	IF Troja/Ljungby	Allsv	20	8	4	12	16	—	—	—	—	—
2003–04	IF Troja/Ljungby	Allsv	43	13	11	24	94	10	6	2	8	2
2004–05	Linköpings HC	J20	2	0	2	2	4	—	—	—	—	—
2004–05	Linköpings HC	SEL	29	1	2	3	14	4	0	0	0	2
2004–05	IF Troja/Ljungby	Allsv	21	6	5	11	37	—	—	—	—	—
2005–06	Linköpings HC	J20	1	1	1	2	2	—	—	—	—	—
2005–06	Linköpings HC	SEL	50	2	7	9	40	13	0	0	0	39
2006–07	Timrå IK	SEL	54	9	16	25	56	—	—	—	—	—
2007–08	Timrå IK	SEL	55	10	10	20	50	11	3	2	5	36
2008–09	Timrå IK	SEL	55	5	12	17	91	7	0	0	0	4
2009–10	Färjestad BK	SEL	55	5	4	9	75	7	0	0	0	4
2010–11	Linköpings HC	SEL	51	3	4	7	49	7	1	0	1	0
2011–12	Timrå IK	SEL	23	1	3	4	10	—	—	—	—	—
2012–13	Timrå IK	SEL	50	3	0	3	18	—	—	—	—	—
2013–14	IF Troja/Ljungby	Allsv	12	0	4	4	8	—	—	—	—	—
2018–19	IF Troja/Ljungby	SWE.3	14	1	2	3	8	—	—	—	—	—
Allsv totals			141	29	24	53	165	15	6	4	10	4
SEL totals			419	39	58	97	403	56	4	3	7	101

=== International ===
Year	Team	Event	GP	G	A	Pts	PIM
2004	Sweden	WJC	6	1	4	5	4
2008	Sweden	WC	9	0	1	1	2
2009	Sweden	WC	9	1	1	2	6
Senior totals			18	1	2	3	8
