= Clubroot (musician) =

English dubstep musician

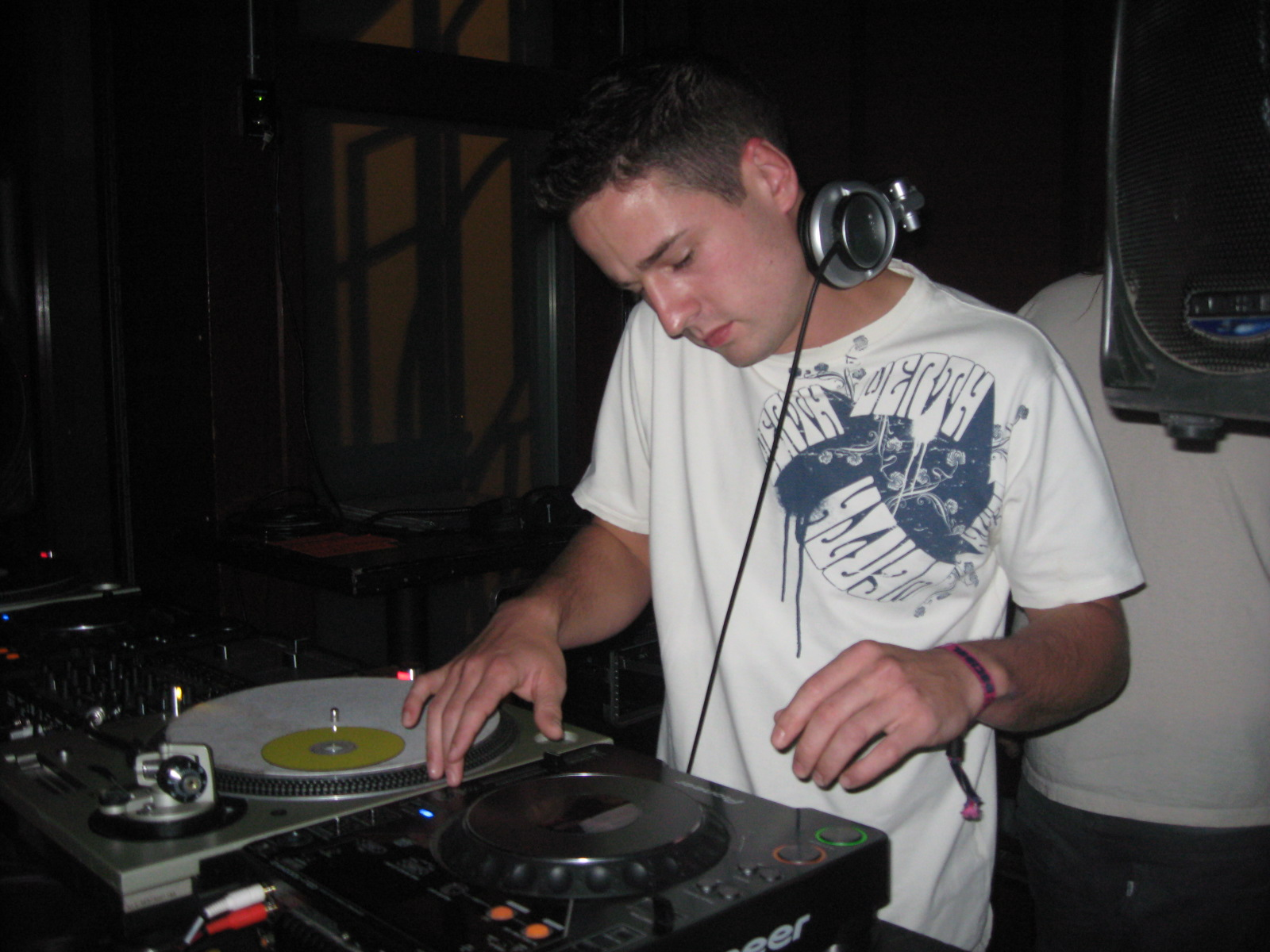

Background information
- Born: Dan Richmond c. 1985
- Origin: St Albans, England
- Genres: Future garage, dubstep, UK garage
- Occupations: Producer, DJ
- Label: Lo Dubs

Clubroot (born Dan Richmond, c. 1985) is a dubstep musician located in St Albans, England. Signed to Lo Dubs, he released his eponymous debut album in 2009. The second album, II – MMX, was released in 2010.
