= Sergei Anshakov =

Russian ice hockey player (born 1984)

- Born: January 13, 1984 (age 42) Moscow, Soviet Union
- Height: 6 ft 3 in (191 cm)
- Weight: 180 lb (82 kg; 12 st 12 lb)
- Position: Left wing
- Shot: Left
- KHL team: free agent
- Played for: Molot-Prikamye Perm; Neftekhimik Nizhnekamsk; Amur Khabarovsk; Sibir Novosibirsk; HC MVD; Dynamo Moscow; Salavat Yulaev Ufa
- NHL draft: 50th overall, 2002; Los Angeles Kings
- Playing career: 2002–2011

Sergei Anshakov (born January 13, 1984) is a Russian former ice hockey left wing. Anshakov was drafted by the Los Angeles Kings in the 2002 NHL entry draft. He began playing in the Russian Super League in 2002 with CSKA Moscow. In 2003, Anshakov was dealt with Martin Strbak to the Penguins for Martin Straka.

On June 7, 2010 Anshakov was transferred from CSKA Moscow to Molot-Prikamie Perm of the Vysshaya Hokkeinaya Liga. He played ten regular season games with the team, scoring two goals and two assists. Anshakov also scored two goals in three post-season appearances during the 2010-11 VHL season.

Anshakov became an unrestricted free agent in 2011 and has not played professional hockey since his last VHL season.

== Career statistics ==
=== Regular season and playoffs ===
			Regular season					Playoffs
Season	Team	League	GP	G	A	Pts	PIM	GP	G	A	Pts	PIM
2000–01	Dynamo–2 Moscow	RUS.3	21	3	4	7	4	—	—	—	—	—
2001–02	CSKA Moscow	RUS.2	39	17	12	29	8	7	3	0	3	0
2001–02	CSKA–2 Moscow	RUS.3	4	3	1	4	0	—	—	—	—	—
2002–03	CSKA Moscow	RSL	25	1	2	3	4	—	—	—	—	—
2002–03	CSKA–2 Moscow	RUS.3	12	13	1	14	4	—	—	—	—	—
2003–04	CSKA Moscow	RSL	33	3	2	5	12	—	—	—	—	—
2003–04	CSKA–2 Moscow	RUS.3	5	3	4	7	12	—	—	—	—	—
2004–05	CSKA Moscow	RSL	11	0	0	0	2	—	—	—	—	—
2004–05	CSKA–2 Moscow	RUS.3	14	12	3	15	0	—	—	—	—	—
2004–05	Salavat Yulaev Ufa	RSL	24	9	3	12	4	—	—	—	—	—
2005–06	Salavat Yulaev Ufa	RSL	6	1	1	2	12	—	—	—	—	—
2005–06	Dynamo Moscow	RSL	1	0	0	0	0	—	—	—	—	—
2005–06	Dynamo–2 Moscow	RUS.3	1	1	0	1	0	—	—	—	—	—
2005–06	HC MVD	RSL	12	1	3	4	2	2	0	1	1	0
2005–06	HC MVD–THK Tver	RUS.3	1	2	0	2	0	—	—	—	—	—
2006–07	CSKA Moscow	RSL	29	2	3	5	12	—	—	—	—	—
2006–07	Sibir Novosibirsk	RSL	17	2	4	6	4	3	1	0	1	2
2006–07	Sibir–2 Novosibirsk	RUS.3	2	2	1	3	0	—	—	—	—	—
2007–08	Amur Khabarovsk	RSL	51	4	2	6	4	—	—	—	—	—
2007–08	Amur–2 Khabarovsk	RUS.3	2	0	0	0	2	—	—	—	—	—
2008–09	Neftekhimik Nizhnekamsk	KHL	41	7	3	10	10	2	0	0	0	0
2008–09	Neftekhimik–2 Nizhnekamsk	RUS.3	1	0	0	0	0	—	—	—	—	—
2009–10	CSKA Moscow	KHL	34	2	3	5	4	—	—	—	—	—
2009–10	Gazovik Tyumen	RUS.2	4	2	3	5	4	6	0	0	0	4
2010–11	Molot–Prikamye Perm	VHL	10	2	2	4	2	3	2	0	2	2
RSL totals			209	23	20	43	56	5	1	1	2	2
KHL totals			75	9	6	15	14	2	0	0	0	0

=== International ===
Year	Team	Event	Result	GP	G	A	Pts	PIM
2002	Russia	WJC18	2nd place, silver medalist(s)	8	2	2	4	2
2003	Russia	WJC	1st place, gold medalist(s)	6	1	1	2	0
2004	Russia	WJC	5th	6	5	2	7	0
Junior totals				20	8	5	13	2
