= Viktor Andrushchenko =

Ukrainian ice hockey player

- Born: 10 May 1986 (age 38); Kyiv, Ukraine, Soviet Union
- Height: 5 ft 9 in (175 cm)
- Weight: 187 lb (85 kg; 13 st 5 lb)
- Position: Forward
- Shoots: Left
- UKR team Former teams: Sokil Kyiv; HC Dinamo Minsk (KHL); HK Neman Grodno; HC Shakhtyor Soligorsk; HK Mogilev
- NHL draft: Undrafted
- Playing career: 2003–present

Viktor Viktorovych Andrushchenko (Ukrainian: Віктор Вікторович Андрущенко; born 10 May 1986) is a Ukrainian ice hockey player. He is currently playing with Sokil Kyiv of the Ukrainian Professional Hockey League (BXL).

Andrushchenko made his Kontinental Hockey League (KHL) debut playing with HC Dinamo Minsk during the 2008–09 KHL season.
