= Andreas Valdix =

Swedish ice hockey player

- Born: December 6, 1984 (age 41) Malmö, Sweden
- Height: 6 ft 0 in (183 cm)
- Weight: 192 lb (87 kg; 13 st 10 lb)
- Position: Forward
- Shoots: Left
- NIHL team Former teams: Sheffield Steeldogs; Malmö Redhawks; Timrå IK; HC TWK Innsbruck; Milton Keynes Lightning; Gyergyói HK; Lippe-Hockey-Hamm; Cardiff Devils; Sheffield Steelers
- NHL draft: 109th overall, 2003; Washington Capitals
- Playing career: 2002–present

Andreas Valdix (born December 6, 1984) is a Swedish professional ice hockey centre who is currently signed to National Ice Hockey League (NIHL) side Sheffield Steeldogs. Valdix most recently iced with Elite Ice Hockey League (EIHL) side Sheffield Steelers. He was selected by the Washington Capitals in the 4th round (109th overall) of the 2003 NHL entry draft.

Valdix has played in the Elitserien, the highest-level ice hockey league in Sweden, with both the Malmö Redhawks and Timrå IK. After playing the majority of seven seasons with IK Oskarshamn of Swedish second division, HockeyAllsvenskan, Valdix opted to move abroad to the Austrian League, agreeing to a one-year contract with HC TWK Innsbruck on April 25, 2014.

Ahead of the 2016/17 season, Valdix signed for the Sheffield Steelers. After two years with the Steelers, Valdix moved to fellow EIHL side Milton Keynes Lightning in August 2018.

After a season in Milton Keynes, Valdix then moved to Romania to sign for Erste Liga side Gyergyói HK in 2019.

Valdix split the 2020/21 season between Gyergyói HK and German Oberliga side Lippe-Hockey-Hamm.

He then returned to the EIHL and signed a short-term deal with Welsh side Cardiff Devils in October 2021, joining as injury cover for forward Brandon McNally. Valdix departed Cardiff in November 2021.

Later that same month, Valdix signed another short-term deal with former club Sheffield Steelers.

After his short-term deal with the Sheffield Steelers came to an end, Valdix signed for the Steelers' affiliate team the Sheffield Steeldogs in February 2022.

== Career statistics ==
=== Regular season and playoffs ===
| | | | Regular season | | | | | Playoffs |
| Season | Team | League | GP | G | A | Pts | PIM | GP | G | A | Pts | PIM |
|---|---|---|---|---|---|---|---|---|---|---|---|---|
| 1999–2000 | Malmö IF | J18 Allsv | 14 | 3 | 7 | 10 | 39 | — | — | — | — | — |
| 2000–01 | Malmö IF | J18 Allsv | 6 | 2 | 2 | 4 | 12 | — | — | — | — | — |
| 2000–01 | Malmö IF | J20 | 19 | 3 | 3 | 6 | 8 | 3 | 2 | 2 | 4 | 2 |
| 2001–02 | MIF Redhawks | J18 Allsv | 1 | 0 | 0 | 0 | 22 | 2 | 0 | 1 | 1 | 0 |
| 2001–02 | MIF Redhawks | J20 | 35 | 11 | 13 | 24 | 58 | 8 | 2 | 2 | 4 | 12 |
| 2001–02 | MIF Redhawks | SEL | 1 | 0 | 0 | 0 | 0 | — | — | — | — | — |
| 2002–03 | MIF Redhawks | J20 | 11 | 10 | 12 | 22 | 16 | 6 | 2 | 5 | 7 | 8 |
| 2002–03 | MIF Redhawks | SEL | 39 | 2 | 0 | 2 | 10 | — | — | — | — | — |
| 2003–04 | Malmö Redhawks | J20 | 9 | 4 | 3 | 7 | 4 | — | — | — | — | — |
| 2003–04 | Malmö Redhawks | SEL | 47 | 2 | 3 | 5 | 8 | — | — | — | — | — |
| 2004–05 | Malmö Redhawks | SEL | 26 | 0 | 1 | 1 | 2 | — | — | — | — | — |
| 2004–05 | Halmstad HF | Allsv | 24 | 4 | 5 | 9 | 14 | 2 | 0 | 0 | 0 | 6 |
| 2005–06 | Nybro Vikings | Allsv | 42 | 4 | 8 | 12 | 73 | — | — | — | — | — |
| 2006–07 | IK Oskarshamn | Allsv | 45 | 13 | 12 | 25 | 38 | — | — | — | — | — |
| 2007–08 | IK Oskarshamn | Allsv | 18 | 6 | 5 | 11 | 51 | — | — | — | — | — |
| 2008–09 | IK Oskarshamn | Allsv | 32 | 14 | 6 | 20 | 36 | — | — | — | — | — |
| 2009–10 | Västerås IK | Allsv | 28 | 4 | 10 | 14 | 53 | — | — | — | — | — |
| 2010–11 | Timrå IK | SEL | 4 | 0 | 1 | 1 | 0 | — | — | — | — | — |
| 2010–11 | IK Oskarshamn | Allsv | 40 | 11 | 14 | 25 | 44 | — | — | — | — | — |
| 2011–12 | IK Oskarshamn | Allsv | 44 | 6 | 10 | 16 | 63 | 6 | 0 | 0 | 0 | 6 |
| 2012–13 | IK Oskarshamn | Allsv | 52 | 6 | 14 | 20 | 30 | 6 | 0 | 1 | 1 | 8 |
| 2013–14 | IK Oskarshamn | Allsv | 51 | 13 | 23 | 36 | 71 | — | — | — | — | — |
| 2014–15 | HC TWK Innsbruck | AUT | 53 | 12 | 20 | 32 | 52 | — | — | — | — | — |
| 2015–16 | HC TWK Innsbruck | AUT | 46 | 8 | 8 | 16 | 22 | — | — | — | — | — |
| 2016–17 | Sheffield Steelers | EIHL | 32 | 10 | 26 | 36 | 16 | 4 | 0 | 1 | 1 | 2 |
| 2017–18 | Sheffield Steelers | EIHL | 56 | 12 | 33 | 45 | 40 | 4 | 1 | 3 | 4 | 4 |
| 2018–19 | Milton Keynes Lightning | EIHL | 57 | 10 | 36 | 46 | 89 | — | — | — | — | — |
| 2019–20 | CS Progym Gheorgheni | EL | 37 | 13 | 25 | 38 | 26 | 9 | 4 | 7 | 11 | 2 |
| 2019–20 | CS Progym Gheorgheni | ROU | 23 | 8 | 19 | 27 | 10 | — | — | — | — | — |
| 2020–21 | CS Progym Gheorgheni | EL | 4 | 0 | 0 | 0 | 4 | — | — | — | — | — |
| 2020–21 | Lippe–Hockey–Hamm | GER.3 | 18 | 13 | 13 | 26 | 20 | — | — | — | — | — |
| 2021–22 | Cardiff Devils | EIHL | 5 | 0 | 0 | 0 | 2 | — | — | — | — | — |
| 2021–22 | Sheffield Steelers | EIHL | 3 | 0 | 1 | 1 | 2 | — | — | — | — | — |
| 2021–22 | Sheffield Steeldogs | GBR.2 | 14 | 7 | 8 | 15 | 18 | 3 | 0 | 1 | 1 | 4 |
| SEL totals | | | 117 | 4 | 5 | 9 | 20 | — | — | — | — | — |
| Allsv totals | | | 376 | 81 | 107 | 188 | 473 | 14 | 0 | 1 | 1 | 20 |
| EIHL totals | | | 153 | 32 | 96 | 128 | 149 | 8 | 1 | 4 | 5 | 6 |

=== International ===
| Year | Team | Event | GP | G | A | Pts | PIM |
|---|---|---|---|---|---|---|---|
| 2002 | Sweden | WJC18 | 8 | 0 | 0 | 0 | 37 |
| 2003 | Sweden | WJC | 6 | 2 | 0 | 2 | 0 |
| 2004 | Sweden | WJC | 5 | 0 | 2 | 2 | 0 |
| Junior totals | | | 19 | 2 | 2 | 4 | 37 |
