= Sebastian Meijer =

Swedish ice hockey player

- Born: September 1, 1984 (age 40); Ulricehamn, Sweden
- Height: 5 ft 10 in (178 cm)
- Weight: 168 lb (76 kg; 12 st 0 lb)
- Position: Center
- Shot: Left
- Played for: SEL; HV71; Leksands IF; Luleå HF; Swe-1; VIK Västerås HK; Malmö Redhawks
- Playing career: 2001–2016

Sebastian Meijer (born September 1, 1984) is a Swedish professional ice hockey player. Meijer represented the Swedish junior national team at the 2004 World Junior Ice Hockey Championships. His brother is singer Lukas Meijer.
