= Vladislav Baláž =

Slovak ice hockey player

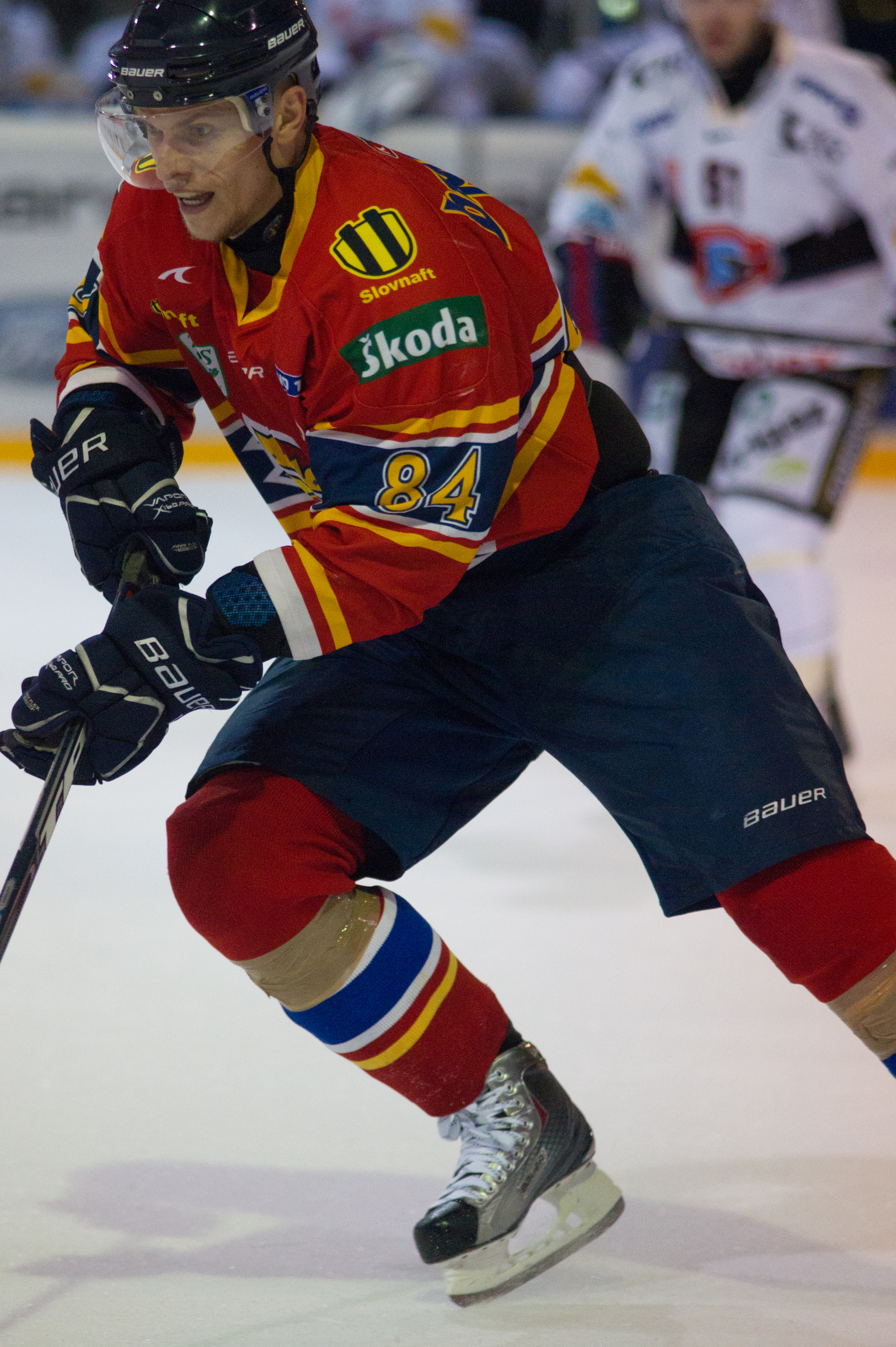
- Baláž in 2010
- Born: January 28, 1984 (age 41) Prešov, Czechoslovakia
- Height: 6 ft 3 in (191 cm)
- Weight: 208 lb (94 kg; 14 st 12 lb)
- Position: Forward
- Shot: Left
- Played for: HK Dukla Trenčín; MsHK Zilina; HKm Zvolen; HC Litvínov
- Playing career: 2004–2014

Vladislav Baláž (born January 28, 1984) is a Slovak former professional ice hockey player. He played in the Slovak Extraliga for HK Dukla Trenčín, MsHK Zilina and HKm Zvolen, as well as the Czech Extraliga for HC Litvínov.
