= Karol Biermann =

Slovak professional ice hockey player

- Height: 5.11 ft 0 in (156 cm)
- Weight: 77 kg (170 lb; 12 st 2 lb)
- Position: Forward
- Shoots: L
- Played for: HC Slovan Bratislava; HK Dukla Senica; HK Brezno

Karol Biermann was a Slovak professional ice hockey player who is most known for playing with HC Slovan Bratislava in the Slovak Extraliga, where he would win the league title. He also represented the Slovakia men's national under-20 ice hockey team.

== Club career ==
In the 2003 season, Biermann played 36 games for the senior team of Slovan Bratislava. In 2005, after winning the Slovak Extraliga with Bratislava, he signed a one-year extension to his contract with the club. After another season, Biermann would end his professional ice hockey career. He played 8 more games for Brezno in the 2008/2009 season while in the lower leagues, but it would not impact his career.

== International career ==
Biermann was nominated to be a part of the Slovakia men's national under-20 ice hockey team ahead of the 2003 U20 Ice Hockey World Championships help in Finland. Biermann was informed about his additional nomination for the World Cup through an SMS text message, replacing the last minute sick defender Ján Mucha in the team. He would not make an appearance in the group stages and the later rounds.
