= Ctirad Ovčáčík =

Czech ice hockey player

Ctirad Ovčáčík (Vejba)
- Born: October 18, 1984 (age 40); Ostrava, Czechoslovakia
- Height: 6 ft 0 in (183 cm)
- Weight: 196 lb (89 kg; 14 st 0 lb)
- Position: Defence
- Shoots: Left
- Czech Extraliga team: HC Vítkovice
- Playing career: 2003–present

Ctirad Ovčáčík (born 18 October 1984, in Ostrava) is a Czech professional ice hockey defenceman. He played with HC Vítkovice in the Czech Extraliga during the 2010–11 Czech Extraliga season.
