= Zach Parise =

American ice hockey player (born 1984)

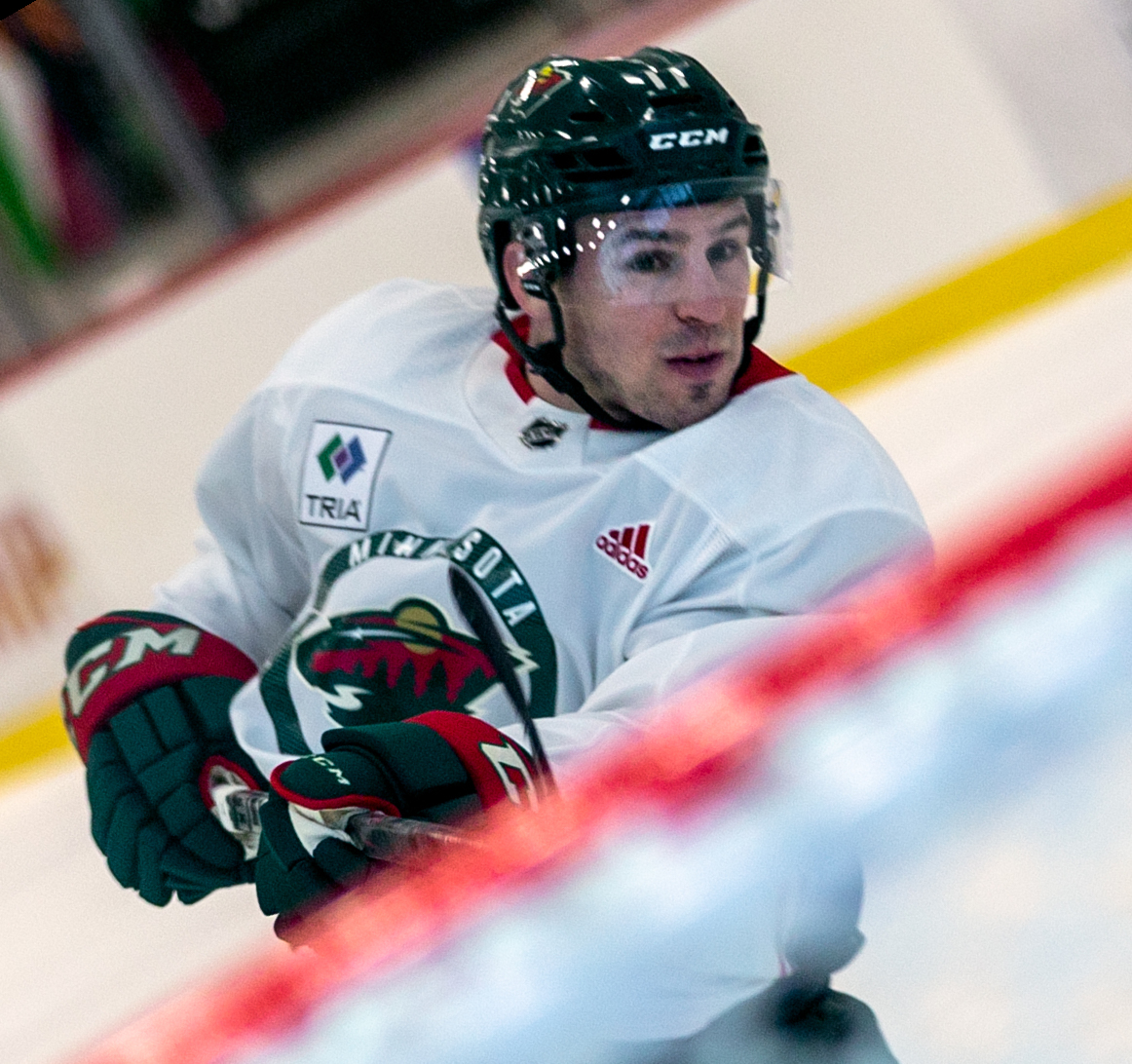
- Parise with the Minnesota Wild in January 2019
- Born: July 28, 1984 (age 42) Minneapolis, Minnesota, U.S.
- Height: 5 ft 11 in (180 cm)
- Weight: 195 lb (88 kg; 13 st 13 lb)
- Position: Left wing
- Shot: Left
- Played for: New Jersey Devils; Minnesota Wild; New York Islanders; Colorado Avalanche
- National team: United States
- NHL draft: 17th overall, 2003; New Jersey Devils
- Playing career: 2005–2024

Zachary Justin Parise (born July 28, 1984) is an American former professional ice hockey player who was a left winger for the New Jersey Devils, Minnesota Wild, New York Islanders, and Colorado Avalanche of the National Hockey League (NHL) from 2005 to 2024. Parise captained the Devils to the 2012 Stanley Cup Final, where they lost to the Los Angeles Kings in six games. Parise was also an alternate captain for the American team at the 2010 Winter Olympics.

Parise's father, Jean-Paul, was a professional ice hockey player who played for Team Canada at the 1972 Summit Series, and for the Minnesota North Stars for several years, and his brother Jordan Parise is a retired professional hockey goaltender. Parise played midget AAA hockey for Shattuck-St. Mary's in Faribault, Minnesota, before spending two seasons at the University of North Dakota, where he was twice nominated for the Hobey Baker Award, given to the top college ice hockey player in America.

He was drafted by the Devils 17th overall in the 2003 NHL entry draft and turned professional after his sophomore season, spending one year playing for the Albany River Rats of the American Hockey League (AHL). Parise joined the Devils for the 2005–06 season. Parise's best NHL season was in 2008–09, when he was the League's third-leading goal scorer (45) behind Jeff Carter with 46 and NHL leader Alexander Ovechkin with 56, while ranking fifth among all NHL players in points with 94.

Parise has represented the United States at several different events. He helped the USA ice hockey team win a gold medal at the 2004 World Junior Championships, where he was named the tournament's Most Valuable Player, Best Forward, and earned a spot on the Tournament All-Star Team. Parise was an alternate captain for the American team at the 2010 Winter Olympics, and scored the tying goal late in the gold medal game against Canada to send it to overtime. Parise and his teammates won a silver medal. After the tournament, Parise was named to the Tournament All-Star Team. Parise was also named captain for the 2014 Winter Olympics. Parise was an alternate captain for the American team at the 2010 Winter Olympics

== Playing career ==
=== Amateur ===
Parise played midget AAA hockey for four seasons for the Shattuck-St. Mary's Sabres in Faribault, Minnesota, where his father J. P. worked in the hockey program. During his final two years (2000–01 and 2001–02) at Shattuck-St. Mary's, he scored 146 goals and 194 assists in 125 games. While playing for the Sabres, Parise twice participated in the Mac's AAA Hockey Tournament held in Calgary, Alberta. In 2000 and 2001, Parise was named the tournament Most Valuable Player (MVP) as well as being named to the tournament All-Star Team. He was the top scorer at the 2001 tournament. After his senior year at Shattuck-St. Mary's, Parise was named the school's Best All-Around Athlete.

Parise played NCAA hockey for the Fighting Sioux at the University of North Dakota (UND) starting with the 2002–03 season. In his first game with UND, Parise scored three goals, becoming only the second freshman to record a hat-trick since 1988. During his freshman season at UND, Parise led the NCAA in rookie scoring (26 goals and 35 assists), and finished eighth in the national scoring race. He captured a number of awards during the season, including being named the Western Collegiate Hockey Association (WCHA) Rookie of the Week four times, and WCHA Offensive Player of the Week once. After the season, he was named a finalist for the Hobey Baker Award, the only freshman nominated that year as well as the first-ever UND freshman nominee. Parise was named UND's Male Rookie Athlete of the Year after the 2002–03 season. In addition to these honors, Parise was named to the WCHA All-Rookie Team and the All-WCHA Third Team. Parise was also named the recipient of the Jeff Anderson Hockey Scholarship, given to the MVP as voted by his teammates.

After his freshman season, Parise was eligible for the 2003 NHL entry draft. Heading into the Draft, he was ranked as the ninth-best North American skater by the NHL Central Scouting Bureau. NHL teams had concerns about his size, but were impressed by his skill and work ethic. At the Draft, the New Jersey Devils traded to obtain the 17th overall pick from the Edmonton Oilers and used it to select Parise.

Parise returned to UND for his sophomore season after being drafted. Along with teammates Brandon Bochenski, Matt Smaby and Drew Stafford, Parise helped the University of North Dakota to the MacNaughton Cup as the WCHA Regular Season Champions. Parise was named a First Team All-American after the season. He was named as one of the ten nominees for the Hobey Baker Award, and was one of three finalists, losing out to eventual winner Junior Lessard. Parise was also named to the All-WCHA Academic Team, and the WCHA All-Tournament Team. After his sophomore season, Parise was named as the winner of the Cliff (Fido) Purpur Award, awarded by the coaching staff to the player who exemplifies "the characteristics of Purpur, a former UND coach, of hard work, determination and being a creator of excitement on the ice."

=== Professional ===
==== New Jersey Devils (2005–2012) ====
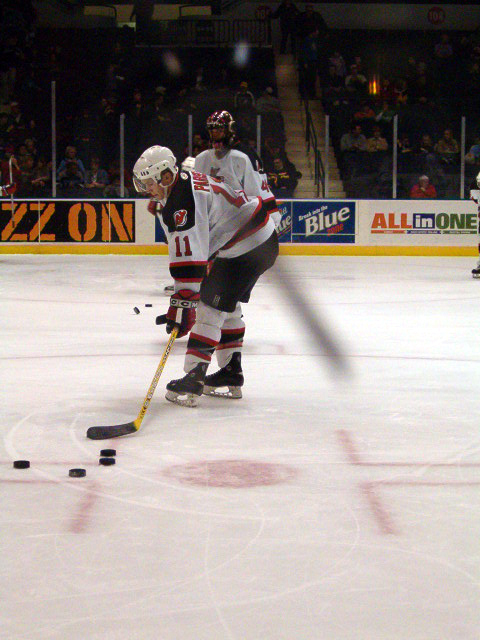
Parise (foreground) practicing with the River Rats in February 2005

After his sophomore season at UND, Parise chose to forgo his final two years of NCAA eligibility to sign a professional contract with the New Jersey Devils. He signed an entry-level contract with the Devils on March 29, 2004. Due to the 2004–05 NHL lockout, Parise spent his first professional season in the American Hockey League (AHL) with the Albany River Rats. In his first professional season, Parise scored 18 goals and added 40 assists. He was chosen to play in the 2004–05 AHL All-Star Game.

Parise made his debut in the NHL at the start of the 2005–06 season. In his rookie year, Parise played in all but one game, totaling 14 goals and 18 assists for 32 points. He became just the 12th player for the Devils to score a goal in his first NHL game. Parise scored his first career Stanley Cup playoff goal against the New York Rangers in Game 3 of the Eastern Conference Quarter-finals.

To open the following season, Parise set a franchise record for scoring the quickest season-opening goal, 26 seconds into the first game. For the season, he nearly doubled his scoring output of the previous season, totaling 62 points. Parise was chosen to play in the NHL YoungStars Game during the All-Star weekend, where he scored two goals and four assists and was named the game's MVP. Heading into the 2007–08 season, Parise and the Devils agreed to terms on a new, four-year contract on August 1, 2007. Parise led the Devils in scoring during the 2007–08 season with 65 points. On November 30, 2007, in a game against the Montreal Canadiens, Parise got his first NHL natural hat-trick.

On October 3, 2008, Parise was named an alternate captain for the Devils. He had a breakout season during his fourth year in the NHL, which saw the Devils increase their scoring output by nearly half a goal per game, breaking away from the team's image as a mostly defensive team. While playing in all 82 games, Parise scored 45 goals and added 49 assists for 94 points. Parise finished fifth overall in NHL scoring, and was third in goal scoring, behind only Alexander Ovechkin and Jeff Carter. During the season, Parise was selected to represent the Eastern Conference at the 2009 All-Star Game. After the season, Parise was chosen as one of three nominees for the Lady Byng Memorial Trophy, awarded to the NHL's most sportsmanlike player. He was also chosen to the NHL's Second All-Star Team, and named the Devils' team MVP.

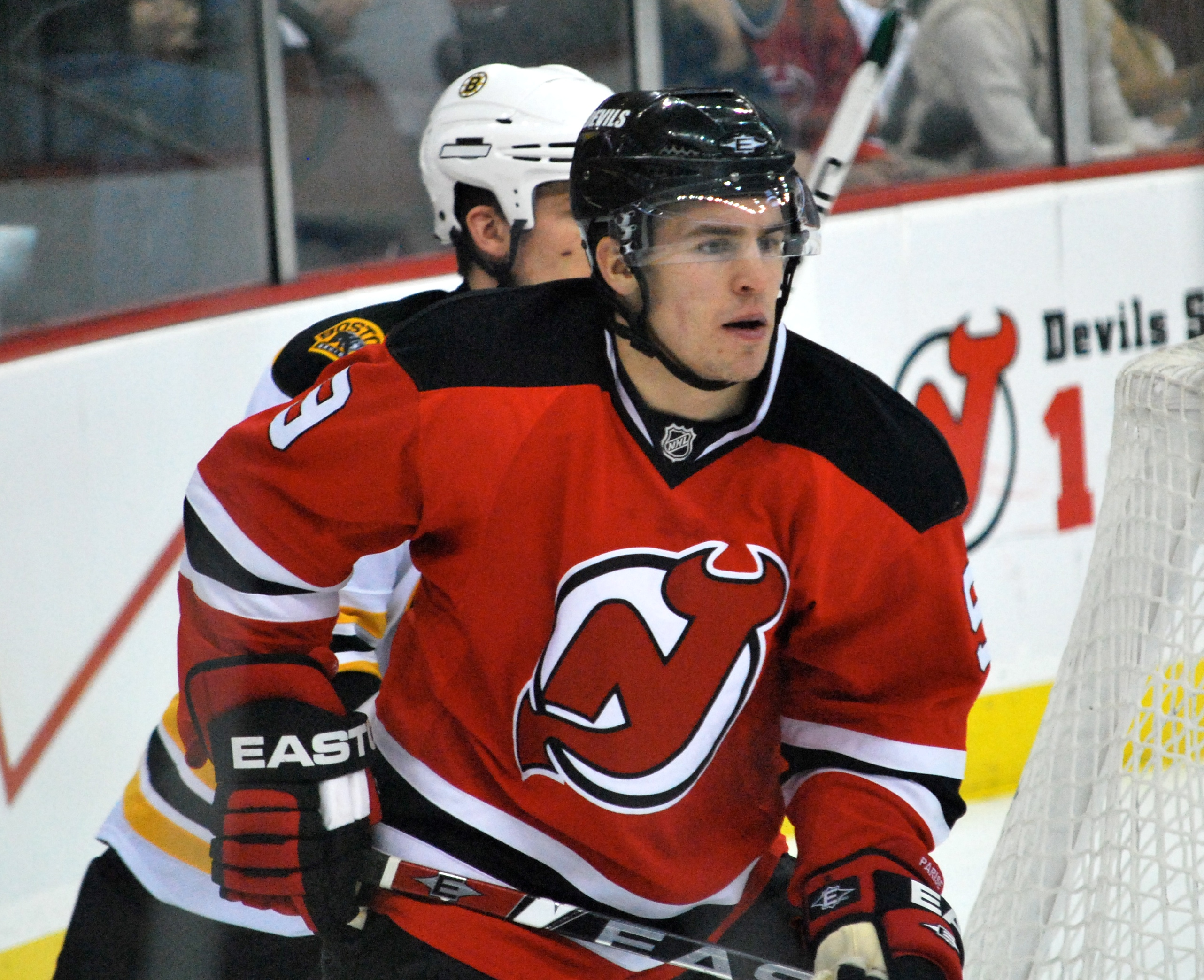
Parise with the Devils during a game against the Boston Bruins, February 2009

During the 2009–10 season, Parise played in 81 games for the Devils, finishing with 38 goals and 44 assists. Parise struggled at times, going 12 games without scoring at one point before recording two goals against the Atlanta Thrashers on December 28, 2009. During the playoffs, Parise and the Devils were eliminated in the Eastern Conference Quarter-finals by the Philadelphia Flyers in five games. Parise scored one goal and added three assists in the five playoff games. At the end of the season, he was selected as the Devils' team MVP for the second year in a row.

In November of the 2010–11 season, Parise tore the meniscus in his right knee, underwent surgery and was deemed to be likely out for the remainder of the season. On March 2, 2011, Parise was cleared to start skating and returned to play on April 2, the same night the Devils were mathematically eliminated from playoff contention.

On July 29, 2011, Parise signed a one-year contract worth $6 million with the Devils. On October 5, 2011, the Devils named him captain. Parise became the second captain in Devils history (the other being Scott Stevens) to lead them to the Stanley Cup Final. The Devils were down 0–3 in the series before finally losing in six games at the hands of the Los Angeles Kings.

==== Minnesota Wild (2012–2021) ====
On July 4, 2012, Parise left the Devils' organization to sign with his hometown Minnesota Wild. Parise noted that his parents played a role in him signing with the Wild, stating "When I made the decision they were real excited as well. That played a big part. I grew up here, I love coming back here in the summers and I thought 'We enjoy it here so much it would be great to be here year round.'" Parise's father, J.P., once captained the Minnesota North Stars. The Wild signed Parise, as well as fellow free agent Ryan Suter, to identical 13-year, $98 million contracts. Parise chose to wear No. 11, the same number his father wore as a North Star; Parise's No. 9 he wore with the Devils was already worn by team captain Mikko Koivu. On July 9, both Parise and Suter were named alternate captains.

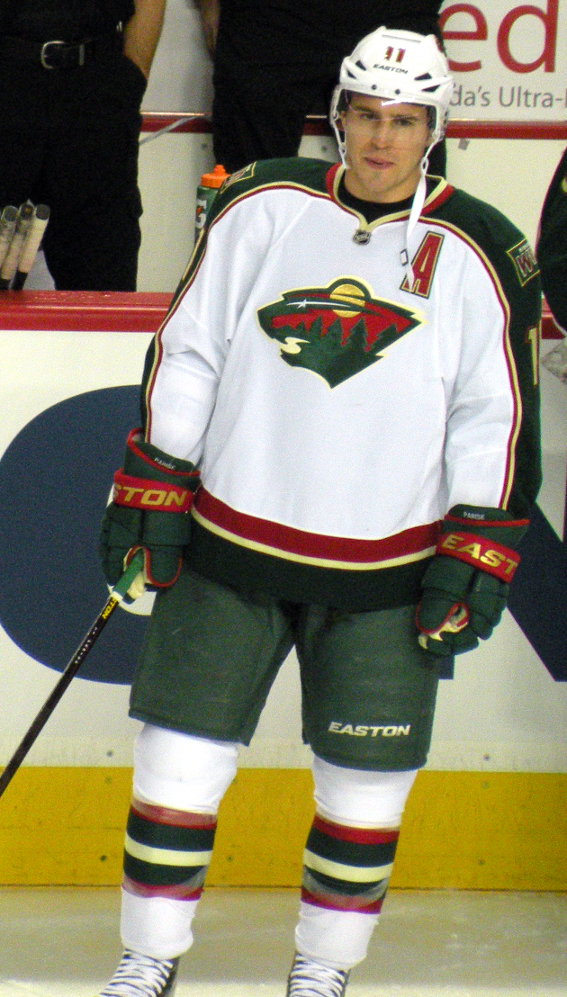
Parise in February 2013. He was named an alternate captain of the Wild after joining them in the 2012 off-season.

Parise scored 18 goals along with 20 assists during the lockout-shortened 2012–13 season. The Wild qualified for the Stanley Cup playoffs for the first time in five years as the eighth seed in the Western Conference. The team lost to the eventual Stanley Cup champion Chicago Blackhawks in five games in the opening round; Parise scored one goal during the series.

On March 20, 2014, Parise returned to the Prudential Center for the first time since leaving the Devils during the 2012 off-season. Parise was booed every time he skated with the puck, especially when his name was announced for a goal. The Wild ended up losing the game 4–3 in overtime.

On November 6, 2014, it was announced that Parise was out "indefinitely" due to a concussion he suffered two days earlier during a 4–1 loss to the Pittsburgh Penguins. Five games later, on November 16, he returned to the Wild lineup. He finished the season with 62 points.

The 2015–16 season brought a host of struggles for Parise, who struggled through a sprained MCL at the beginning of the season, before injuring his back near the end of the season. In a game against the San Jose Sharks, Parise sustained a hit from Logan Couture that further aggravated the injury, taking him out for the rest of the season and the Wild's short playoff run. Even with the injuries, Parise led the team in goals and was second in points. He also led the NHL with a total of three hat tricks on the season.

On October 23, 2016, Parise scored 2 goals to earn his 300th goal in his career, in a loss against the New York Islanders.

Parise played his 1,000th career NHL game on February 7, 2020, in an away game against the Dallas Stars. On February 24, 2021, Parise scored his 800th NHL point in the Wild's 6–2 win over the Colorado Avalanche.

On July 13, 2021, the Wild bought out the remaining four years of Parise's contract.

==== New York Islanders (2021–2023) ====
On September 10, 2021, Parise signed as a free agent to a one-year, $1.5 million contract with the New York Islanders. In reuniting with general manager Lou Lamoriello, who drafted him during their tenure with the Devils, Parise followed his father's footsteps in joining the Islanders after a long tenure with Minnesota. Projected to be utilised in a top nine forward role, Parise made his Islanders debut to open the 2021–22 season on October 14, 2021, against the Carolina Hurricanes. Off to a slow start offensively, Parise waited until his 23rd appearance to notch his first goal with the Islanders against the Devils, registering the game-winning goal in a 4–2 victory on December 11. He registered his 400th career goal in a 4–3 shootout loss to the San Jose Sharks on February 24, 2022. Adding a veteran presence, on March 21, Parise agreed to sign a one-year, $1.5 million contract extension with the team. He completed his first season with the Islanders, contributing with 15 goals and 20 assists for 35 points through all 82 regular season games, yet unable to help propel the Islanders to a playoff berth for the first time in four years.

In the following 2022–23 season, Parise continued to contribute offensively with the Islanders in a utility role, reaching 20 goals for the 11th time in his career, totalling 21 goals and 13 assists for 34 points, while never missing a game through his tenure with New York. Parise concluded his contract with the Islanders after going scoreless through six playoff games in a first-round series defeat by the Carolina Hurricanes.

==== Colorado Avalanche (2024) ====
Sitting out the first half of the 2023–24 season as a free agent, on January 26, 2024, Parise signed a one-year, $825,000 contract with the Colorado Avalanche. Approaching the end of the regular season, and with the Avalanche having qualified for the 2024 Stanley Cup playoffs, Parise confirmed that he would retire from hockey at the conclusion of the Avalanche's playoff run. On May 17, Parise played his final game in the NHL, a 2–1 overtime loss to the Dallas Stars in game six of the second round.

== International play ==
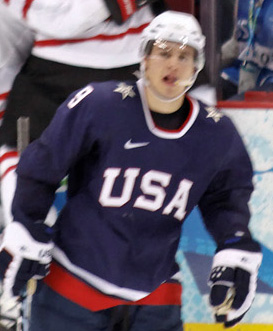

Medal record

Men's ice hockey

Representing the United States

Olympic Games
Silver medal – second place	2010 Vancouver	

World Junior Championships
Gold medal – first place	2004 Finland	

World U18 Championships
Gold medal – first place	2002 Slovakia	

Although Parise's father J. P. played internationally for Canada during his hockey career, Zach and his brother Jordan are American citizens. Parise's international career started at the under-18 level, where he played for the United States during the 2002 IIHF World U18 Championships. Parise finished the tournament 14th overall in scoring with seven goals and three assists in eight games and the United States won the gold medal.

Parise next represented the United States at the under-20 level, playing at the 2003 World Junior Championships. Team USA finished in fourth place and Parise scored four goals and added four assists to finish eighth in tournament scoring. The following year, at the 2004 World Junior Championships, Parise led the Americans to their first-ever gold medal at the tournament. He scored five goals and added six assists and was awarded the Tournament MVP, Best Forward and was named to the Tournament All-Star Team.

In 2005 and 2007, Parise played for the United States at the World Hockey Championships, although he did not suit up for the full slate of games in either event. In 2008, Parise served as an alternate captain for the American team at the World Championships. He was named Team USA's Player of the Game against Germany during this tournament, and he was also selected as one of the team's Top Three Players at the end of the tournament by the coaching staff.

On January 1, 2010, Parise was named to the 2010 Men's Olympic Hockey Team, and was later named as one of the team's alternate captains. Parise scored both of Team USA's goals in 2–0 quarter-final win over Switzerland. In the final against Canada, Parise scored a game-tying goal with 24 seconds left in the third period to send the game into overtime, although Parise and his teammates had to settle for the silver medal after a Sidney Crosby goal during overtime. For the tournament, Parise finished third in the tournament in scoring, and he was named to the Olympic All-Star team with countrymen Ryan Miller and Brian Rafalski. In 2014, Parise was again selected to represent his country at the Olympics, and was given the added responsibility of serving as team captain. Parise and the United States capped off their 2014 Olympic campaign with a 5–0 loss to Finland in the bronze medal game.

In 2016, Parise was selected to play for Team USA at the 2016 World Cup of Hockey.

== Personal life ==
While playing with the New Jersey Devils, Parise gave his time to New Jersey public library system and served as a Library Champion, a program which promotes the importance of reading to children.

Parise resides in Edina, Minnesota. He is married to his college sweetheart Alisha Woods, and they had twins together in 2014. Parise's parents, former NHL player and coach J. P. and Donna, lived in Prior Lake, Minnesota. Parise's father died on January 7, 2015. Parise's father was a Franco-Ontarian from Smooth Rock Falls in Northern Ontario, and was diagnosed with cancer during the Winter Olympics. Zach was born during his father's tenure as assistant coach of the Minnesota North Stars.

Parise trains with EVO Ultrafit, and is sponsored by Easton Hockey.

Parise's older brother, Jordan, is a former professional goaltender who had played in the Devils' system.

== Career statistics ==
=== Regular season and playoffs ===
Bold indicates led league

			Regular season					Playoffs
Season	Team	League	GP	G	A	Pts	PIM	GP	G	A	Pts	PIM
2000–01	Shattuck-Saint Mary's	Midget AAA	58	69	93	162	—	—	—	—	—	—
2001–02	Shattuck-Saint Mary's	Midget AAA	67	77	101	178	58	—	—	—	—	—
2001–02	US NTDP U18	USDP	12	7	7	14	6	—	—	—	—	—
2002–03	University of North Dakota	WCHA	39	26	35	61	34	—	—	—	—	—
2003–04	University of North Dakota	WCHA	37	23	32	55	24	—	—	—	—	—
2004–05	Albany River Rats	AHL	73	18	40	58	56	—	—	—	—	—
2005–06	New Jersey Devils	NHL	81	14	18	32	28	9	1	2	3	2
2006–07	New Jersey Devils	NHL	82	31	31	62	30	11	7	3	10	8
2007–08	New Jersey Devils	NHL	81	32	33	65	25	5	1	4	5	2
2008–09	New Jersey Devils	NHL	82	45	49	94	24	7	3	3	6	2
2009–10	New Jersey Devils	NHL	81	38	44	82	32	5	1	3	4	0
2010–11	New Jersey Devils	NHL	13	3	3	6	6	—	—	—	—	—
2011–12	New Jersey Devils	NHL	82	31	38	69	32	24	**8**	7	15	4
2012–13	Minnesota Wild	NHL	48	18	20	38	16	5	1	0	1	2
2013–14	Minnesota Wild	NHL	67	29	27	56	30	13	4	10	14	6
2014–15	Minnesota Wild	NHL	74	33	29	62	41	10	4	6	10	4
2015–16	Minnesota Wild	NHL	70	25	28	53	36	—	—	—	—	—
2016–17	Minnesota Wild	NHL	69	19	23	42	30	5	2	1	3	8
2017–18	Iowa Wild	AHL	1	0	1	1	0	—	—	—	—	—
2017–18	Minnesota Wild	NHL	42	15	9	24	14	3	3	0	3	2
2018–19	Minnesota Wild	NHL	74	28	33	61	26	—	—	—	—	—
2019–20	Minnesota Wild	NHL	69	25	21	46	8	4	0	3	3	2
2020–21	Minnesota Wild	NHL	45	7	11	18	6	4	2	1	3	0
2021–22	New York Islanders	NHL	82	15	20	35	28	—	—	—	—	—
2022–23	New York Islanders	NHL	82	21	13	34	24	6	0	0	0	2
2023–24	Colorado Avalanche	NHL	30	5	5	10	8	11	2	1	3	0
NHL totals			1,254	434	455	889	444	122	39	44	83	44

=== International statistics ===
Year	Team	Event	Result	GP	G	A	Pts	PIM
2002	United States	WJC18	1st place, gold medalist(s)	8	7	3	10	6
2003	United States	WJC	4th	7	4	4	8	4
2004	United States	WJC	1st place, gold medalist(s)	6	5	6	11	4
2005	United States	WC	6th	3	0	2	2	0
2007	United States	WC	5th	1	0	0	0	0
2008	United States	WC	6th	7	5	3	8	2
2010	United States	OG	2nd place, silver medalist(s)	6	4	4	8	0
2014	United States	OG	4th	6	1	0	1	0
2016	United States	WCH	7th	3	0	1	1	4
Junior totals				21	16	13	29	14
Senior totals				26	10	10	20	6

Statistics source

== Awards ==
=== Amateur ===
Award	Year
Mac's AAA Midget Hockey Tournament MVP	2000, 2001
Mac's AAA Midget Hockey Tournament All-Star Team	2000, 2001
Shattuck-St. Mary's Best All-Around Athlete	2002
University of North Dakota Male Rookie Athlete of the Year	2003
Jeff Anderson Hockey Scholarship	2003
WCHA All-Rookie Team	2003
All-WCHA Third Team	2003
All-WCHA First Team	2004
NCAA First-Team All-American by ACHA	2003–04
All-WCHA Academic Team	2004
WCHA All-Tournament Team	2004
Hobey Baker Memorial Award Finalist	2004
Cliff (Fido) Purpur Award	2004

=== NHL ===
Award	Year
NHL YoungStars Game MVP	2007
NHL YoungStar	2007
NHL All-Star Game	2009
NHL Second All-Star Team	2009
Bob Nystrom Award	2022, 2023
New Jersey Devils MVP	2008, 2009, 2010
NHL 2K SuperCard cover athlete	2015

=== International ===
Award	Year
World Junior Best Forward	2004
World Junior Tournament All-Star	2004
World Championships Top Three Player	2008
Winter Olympic All-Star team	2010

Sporting positions
Preceded by Adrian Foster	New Jersey Devils first-round draft pick 2003	Succeeded by Travis Zajac
Preceded by Jamie Langenbrunner	New Jersey Devils captain 2011–12	Succeeded by Bryce Salvador
