= Ville Varakas =

Finnish ice hockey player

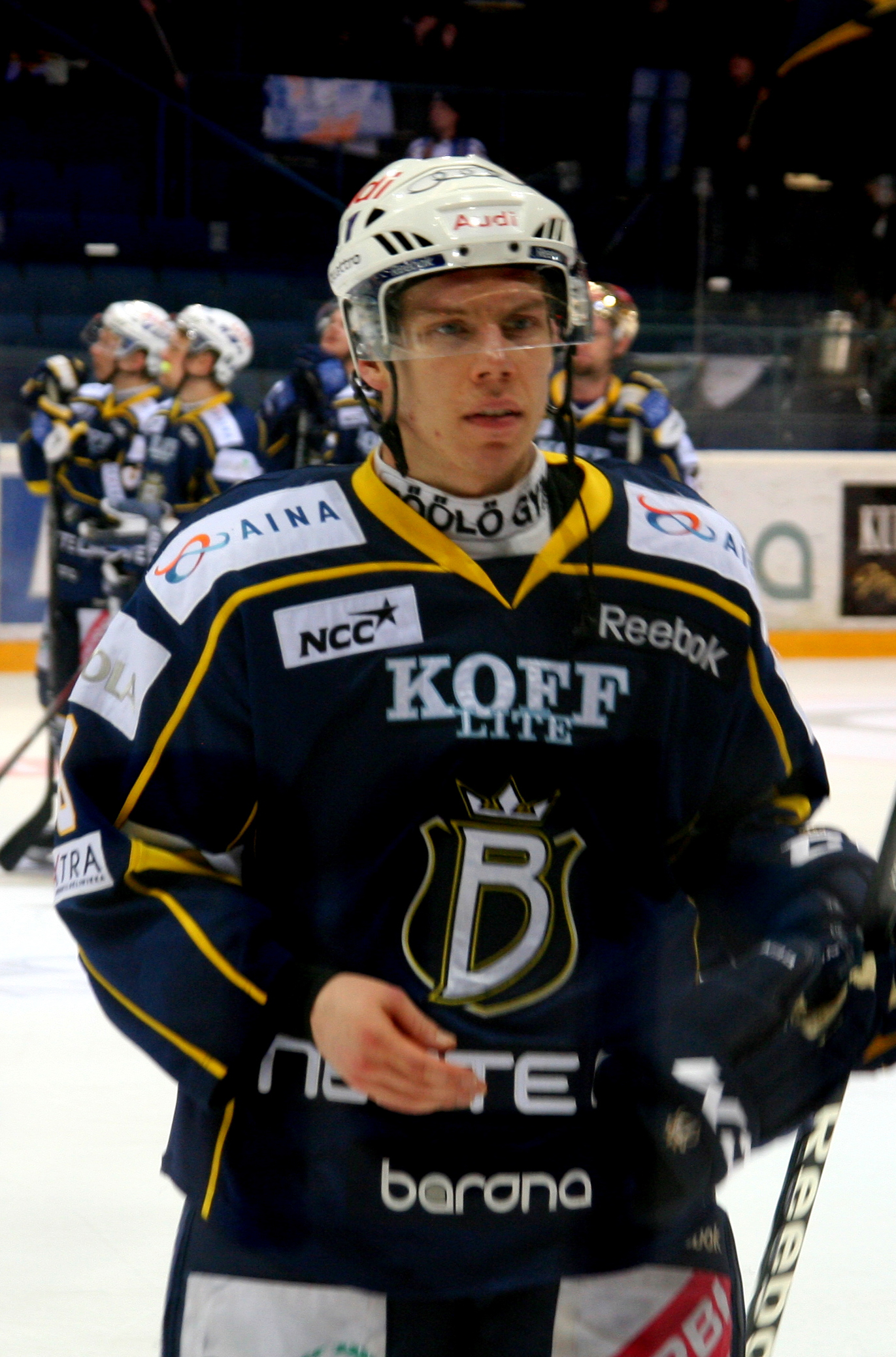
- Born: February 13, 1984 (age 41); Helsinki, Finland
- Height: 6 ft 0 in (183 cm)
- Weight: 192 lb (87 kg; 13 st 10 lb)
- Position: Defence
- Shoots: Left
- Liiga team Former teams: HIFK; Djurgårdens IF; Lahti Pelicans; Orli Znojmo; KalPa; Espoo Blues; Växjö Lakers
- Playing career: 2003–present

Ville Varakas (born February 13, 1984) is a Finnish professional ice hockey defenceman. He is currently playing with HIFK of the Liiga.

Varakas made his SM-liiga debut playing with HIFK during the 2003–04 SM-liiga season.
