= Joni Töykkälä =

Finnish ice hockey player and coach

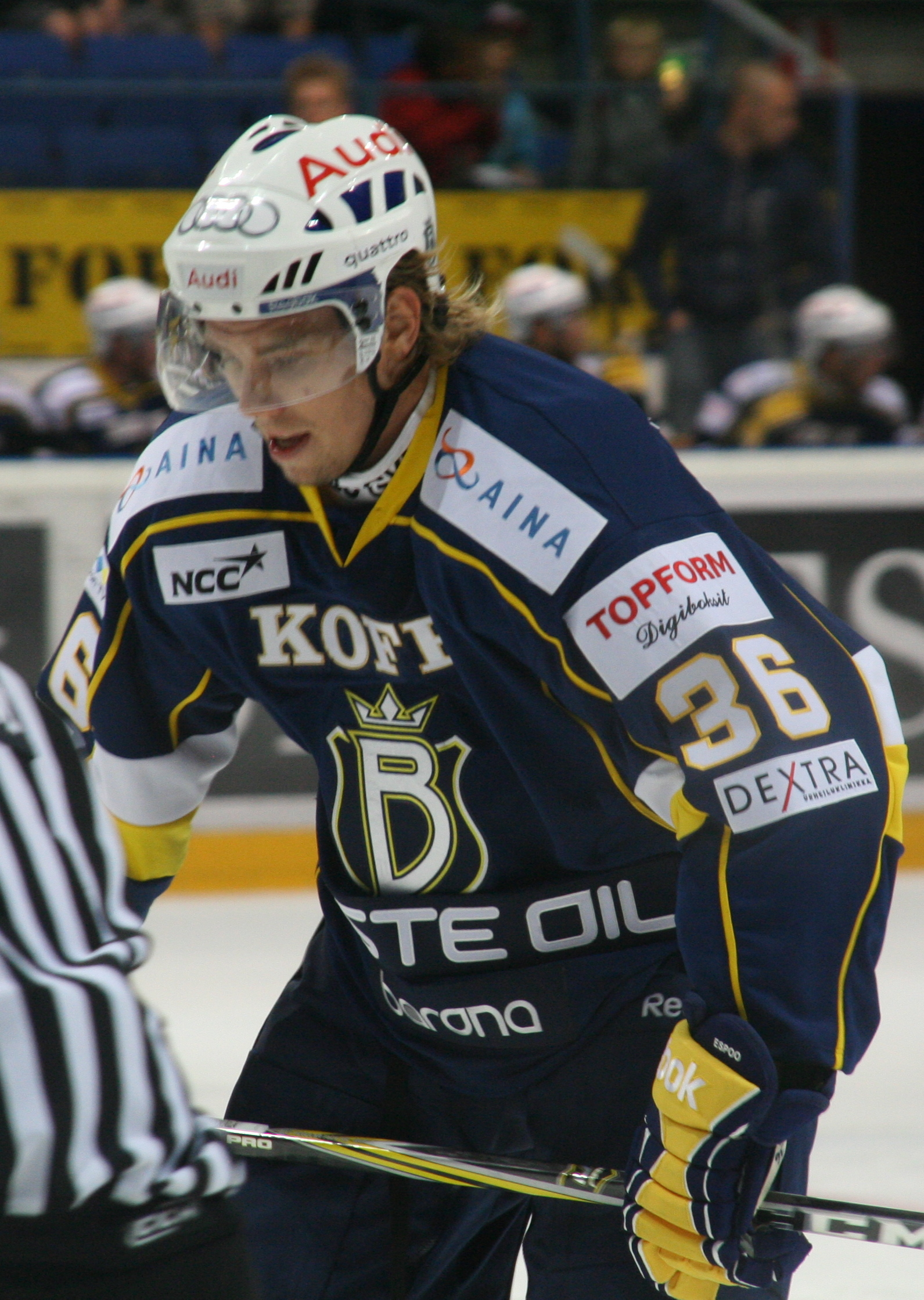
- Joni Töykkälä
- Born: February 25, 1984 (age 41); Espoo, Finland
- Height: 6 ft 0 in (183 cm)
- Weight: 185 lb (84 kg; 13 st 3 lb)
- Position: Forward
- Shot: Left
- SM-liiga team: HIFK
- Playing career: 2003–2014

Joni Töykkälä (born February 25, 1984) is a retired Finnish professional ice hockey forward who is currently an assistant coach for the HIFK under 16 hockey team.

Töykkälä played his first Liiga game in 2003 with the Blues where he had been playing his junior hockey.

Töykkälä also played for Tappara, TPS, and HIFK in Liiga during his career.

== Regular season and playoffs ==
			Regular season					Playoffs
Season	Team	League	GP	G	A	Pts	PIM	GP	G	A	Pts	PIM
2003–04	Blues	SM-liiga	51	2	1	3	2	9	0	0	0	0
2004–05	Blues	SM-liiga	53	2	3	5	37	-	-	-	-	-
2005–06	Blues	SM-liiga	35	1	1	2	29	-	-	-	-	-
2005–06	Tappara	SM-liiga	14	2	1	3	10	5	0	0	0	0
2005–06	HC Salamat	Mestis	1	1	1	2	0	-	-	-	-	-
2006–07	Blues	SM-liiga	51	2	5	7	32	9	0	2	2	4
2007–08	Blues	SM-liiga	55	2	2	4	8	17	4	0	4	2
2008–09	Blues	SM-liiga	9	0	0	0	4	-	-	-	-	-
2008–09	TPS	SM-liiga	43	3	7	10	14	8	0	0	0	18
2009–10	HIFK	SM-liiga	58	8	8	16	32	6	0	1	1	8
2010–11	HIFK	SM-liiga	41	3	5	8	12	16	0	2	2	10
2011–12	Blues	SM-liiga	56	4	4	8	14	16	2	2	4	2
2012–13	HIFK	SM-liiga	43	1	3	4	4	8	0	1	1	2
2013–14	HCK	Mestis	29	8	6	14	8	-	-	-	-	-
SM-liiga totals			509	30	40	70	198	94	6	8	14	46
