= Milan Hruška =

Slovak ice hockey player

- Born: April 26, 1985 (age 39); Topoľčany, Czechoslovakia
- Height: 6 ft 0 in (183 cm)
- Weight: 209 lb (95 kg; 14 st 13 lb)
- Position: Defence
- Catches: Left
- Slovak 1. Liga team Former teams: HC Topoľčany; HK Nitra; HC Slovan Bratislava; HK Dukla Trenčín; HC Kometa Brno; HC Vítkovice; BK Mladá Boleslav; HC Nové Zámky
- National team: Slovakia
- NHL draft: Undrafted
- Playing career: 2005–present

Milan Hruška (born April 26, 1985) is a Slovak ice hockey defenceman. He currently plays for HC Topoľčany in the Slovak 1. Liga.

Hruška previously played in the Czech Extraliga for HC Kometa Brno, HC Vítkovice and BK Mladá Boleslav. He also played in the Slovak Extraliga for HK Nitra, HC Slovan Bratislava, HK Dukla Trenčín, and HC Nové Zámky.

Prior to turning professional, Hruška spent one season in the Quebec Major Junior Hockey League for the P.E.I. Rocket.
