= Joakim Lundström =

Swedish ice hockey player

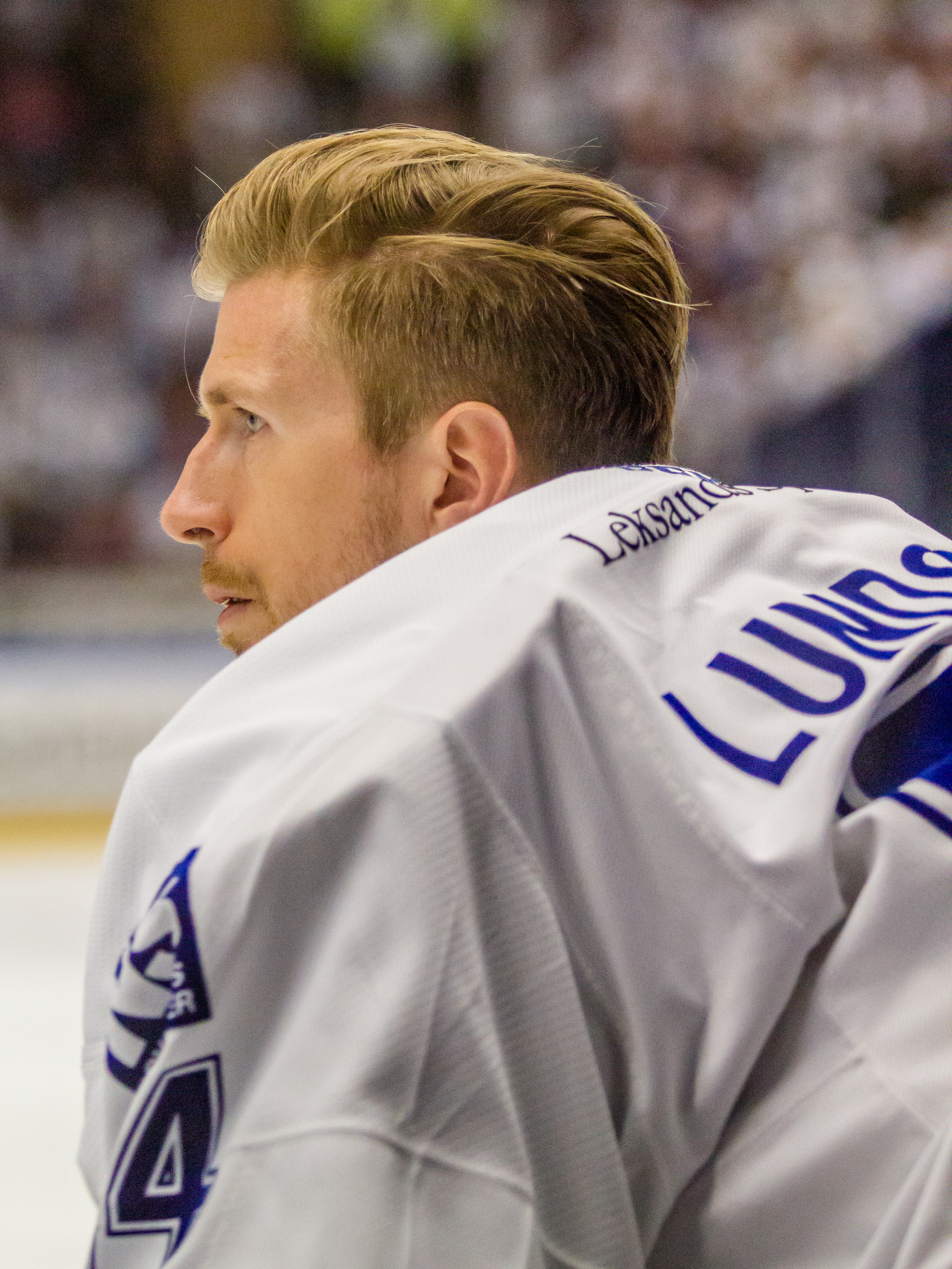
- Born: February 25, 1984 (age 42) Gävle, Sweden
- Height: 6 ft 1 in (185 cm)
- Weight: 174 lb (79 kg; 12 st 6 lb)
- Position: Goaltender
- Shot: Left
- Played for: Brynäs IF; Frölunda HC; Timrå IK; Admiral Vladivostok; HIFK; Leksands IF; KHL Medveščak Zagreb; HC Nove Zamky; HC Košice; HSC Csíkszereda
- Playing career: 2003–2019

Joakim Lundström (born February 25, 1984) is a Swedish former professional ice hockey goaltender. His youth team was Strömsbro IF.

== Playing career ==
Lundström played his first professional game during the 2003–04 Elitserien season with Brynäs IF. He played three Elitserien games that season. Lundström then spent the six following seasons in lesser divisions, mainly with IF Sundsvall Hockey of the HockeyAllsvenskan, but also with Valbo HC of the Swedish Division 1, before signing with Frölunda HC prior to the 2010–11 season. Playing 19 Elitserien games, he posted a 91.57 save percentage during the 2010–11 season. In April 2011, Lundström signed with Timrå IK.

In June 2017 Joakim signed with HC Košice

== Game-show participation ==
Lundström participated in the 2011 edition of the Swedish game show Postkodkampen, being Team Timrå's leader. The team advanced to the semifinal, after beating Team Mariestad.
