= Tomáš Bulík =

Slovak professional ice hockey centre

- Born: August 27, 1985 (age 40) Prešov, Czechoslovakia
- Height: 5 ft 10 in (178 cm)
- Weight: 190 lb (86 kg; 13 st 8 lb)
- Position: Centre
- team Former teams: Free agent HC Košice; MsHK Žilina; HC Yugra; HC Slovan Bratislava; HK Dukla Trenčín; HC ’05 Banská Bystrica; MHk 32 Liptovský Mikuláš; MHC Martin; HC Bílí Tygři Liberec; Hradec Králové
- National team: Slovakia
- Playing career: 2003–present

Tomas Bulik (born August 27, 1985) is a Slovak professional ice hockey centre. He is currently a free agent having last played for HK Dukla Trenčín of the Slovak Extraliga. He participated at the 2010 IIHF World Championship as a member of the Slovakia men's national ice hockey team.

== Career statistics ==
			Regular season					Playoffs
Season	Team	League	GP	G	A	Pts	PIM	GP	G	A	Pts	PIM
1999–00	HC Presov 07 U18	Slovak U18	11	0	2	2	2	—	—	—	—	—
2002–03	HC Kosice U20	Slovak U20	—	—	—	—	—	—	—	—	—	—
2002–03	HC Kosice U18	Slovak U18	10	10	3	13	2	—	—	—	—	—
2002–03	HK Trebisov	Slovak2	2	1	0	1	0	—	—	—	—	—
2003–04	HC Kosice II	Slovak2	4	5	2	7	0	—	—	—	—	—
2003–04	HC Kosice	Slovak	45	7	3	10	2	8	0	0	0	12
2004–05	HC Kosice U20	Slovak U20	8	11	3	14	2	4	1	7	8	2
2004–05	HC Kosice	Slovak	48	1	11	12	18	5	0	0	0	0
2005–06	HC Kosice	Slovak	11	0	1	1	6	—	—	—	—	—
2005–06	MHC Martin	Slovak	24	3	5	8	18	—	—	—	—	—
2005–06	HK Lietajúce kone Prešov	Slovak2	5	2	6	8	4	5	1	0	1	0
2006–07	MsHK Zilina	Slovak	38	4	5	9	16	—	—	—	—	—
2007–08	HK 32 Liptovsky Mikulas	Slovak	47	5	13	18	32	—	—	—	—	—
2007–08	HC Banska Bystrica	Slovak2	6	2	5	7	0	14	5	7	12	6
2008–09	HC Banska Bystrica	Slovak	54	20	18	38	62	5	0	2	2	6
2009–10	HC Banska Bystrica	Slovak	44	23	31	54	34	6	1	3	4	6
2010–11	Yugra Khanty-Mansiysk	KHL	7	0	0	0	0	—	—	—	—	—
2010–11	HC Slovan Bratislava	Slovak	30	5	7	12	4	5	0	1	1	4
2011–12	HC Slovan Bratislava	Slovak	55	20	26	46	44	16	6	4	10	20
2012–13	HK Dukla Trencin	Slovak	2	0	1	1	0	—	—	—	—	—
2012–13	MsHK Zilina	Slovak	3	0	0	0	4	—	—	—	—	—
2012–13	HC Kosice	Slovak	20	6	8	14	10	—	—	—	—	—
2012–13	Bílí Tygři Liberec	Czech	11	6	3	9	6	—	—	—	—	—
2013–14	Bílí Tygři Liberec	Czech	44	11	13	24	40	3	0	1	1	2
2014–15	Bílí Tygři Liberec	Czech	45	3	7	10	32	—	—	—	—	—
2015–16	MsHK Zilina	Slovak	8	3	4	7	4	—	—	—	—	—
2015–16	HC Energie Karlovy Vary	Czech	27	1	4	5	18	—	—	—	—	—
2015–16	Mountfield HK	Czech	8	0	0	0	2	—	—	—	—	—
2016–17	Mountfield HK	Czech	14	1	1	2	4	—	—	—	—	—
2016–17	HC Stadion Litoměřice	Czech2	3	3	2	5	0	—	—	—	—	—
2016–17	HK Dukla Trencin	Slovak	21	6	3	9	18	—	—	—	—	—
2017–18	HK Dukla Trencin	Slovak	26	1	3	4	12	—	—	—	—	—
Slovak totals			476	104	139	243	284	45	7	10	17	48
Czech totals			149	22	28	50	102	11	3	2	5	6
