= Henrik Blomqvist =

Swedish ice hockey player

- Born: March 24, 1984 (age 42) Växjö, Sweden
- Height: 5 ft 11 in (180 cm)
- Weight: 189 lb (86 kg; 13 st 7 lb)
- Position: Defence
- Shot: Right
- SM-liiga team: Pelicans
- Playing career: 2002–2018

Henrik Blomqvist is a Swedish professional ice hockey defenceman who currently plays for Pelicans of the SM-liiga.

== Career statistics ==
			Regular season					Playoffs
Season	Team	League	GP	G	A	Pts	PIM	GP	G	A	Pts	PIM
1999–00	Växjö Lakers HC	Division 2	—	—	—	—	—	—	—	—	—	—
2000–01	Växjö Lakers HC	Division 2	—	1	0	1	—	—	—	—	—	—
2001–02	MIF Redhawks J18	J18 Allsvenskan	3	2	1	3	24	1	0	0	0	4
2001–02	New York Rangers J20	J20 SuperElit	37	7	3	10	145	8	2	0	2	22
2002–03	MIF Redhawks J20	J20 SuperElit	21	5	9	14	134	1	0	0	0	0
2002–03	IF Troja-Ljungby	Allsvenskan	4	0	0	0	10	—	—	—	—	—
2003–04	Växjö Lakers HC	Allsvenskan	41	5	6	11	105	—	—	—	—	—
2004–05	Växjö Lakers HC	Allsvenskan	20	1	1	2	67	—	—	—	—	—
2004–05	IF Troja-Ljungby	Allsvenskan	10	3	1	4	22	8	2	1	3	10
2005–06	Stjernen Hockey	Norway	35	12	2	14	146	—	—	—	—	—
2006–07	Stjernen Hockey	Norway	12	4	2	6	126	—	—	—	—	—
2006–07	Tingsryds AIF	Division 1	2	2	2	4	34	—	—	—	—	—
2006–07	Odense Bulldogs	Denmark	15	5	9	14	50	6	1	2	3	20
2007–08	AaB Ishockey	Denmark	30	8	12	20	86	4	0	0	0	22
2008–09	Bofors IK	HockeyAllsvenskan	19	0	5	5	43	—	—	—	—	—
2008–09	Tingsryds AIF	Division 1	12	1	1	2	18	10	3	3	6	8
2009–10	Rødovre Mighty Bulls	Denmark	33	9	22	31	114	6	0	3	3	6
2010–11	Lahti Pelicans	SM-liiga	19	0	2	2	41	—	—	—	—	—
2011–12	Stjernen Hockey	Norway	30	7	11	18	78	—	—	—	—	—
2013–14	KBA Pirates	Division 3	5	2	1	3	29	—	—	—	—	—
2015–16	Hanson Brothers	Division 4	1	0	0	0	0	—	—	—	—	—
2016–17	Nynäshamns IF	Division 2	—	—	—	—	—	—	—	—	—	—
2017–18	Nynäshamns IF	Division 2	1	1	0	1	2	—	—	—	—	—
Allsvenskan totals			75	9	8	17	204	13	2	3	5	24
Denmark totals			78	22	43	65	250	16	1	5	6	48
Norway totals			77	23	15	38	350	—	—	—	—	—
