= 2003 World Junior Ice Hockey Championships rosters =

Below are the rosters for teams competing in the 2003 World Junior Ice Hockey Championships.

== Group A ==
=== Russia ===
- Head coach: (Russia) Rafail Ishmatov

Pos.	No.	Player	Team	NHL Rights
GK	20	Konstantin Barulin	(Russia) Gazovik Tyumen	
GK	30	Andrei Medvedev	(Russia) HC Spartak Moscow	Calgary Flames
D	3	Konstantin Korneyev	(Russia) Krylya Sovetov Moscow	Montreal Canadiens
D	4	Denis Yezhov	(Russia) HC Lada Togliatti	
D	5	Denis Grebeshkov	(Russia) Lokomotiv Yaroslavl	Los Angeles Kings
D	7	Fedor Tyutin	(Russia) SKA St. Petersburg	New York Rangers
D	12	Kirill Koltsov	(Russia) Avangard Omsk	Vancouver Canucks
D	22	Dmitri Fakhrutdinov	(Russia) Lokomotiv Yaroslavl	
D	24	Maxim Kondratyev	(Russia) HC Lada Togliatti	Toronto Maple Leafs
D	25	Mikhail Lyubushin	(Russia) Krylya Sovetov Moscow	Los Angeles Kings
F	6	Dmitri Pestunov	(Russia) Metallurg Magnitogorsk	
F	8	Alexander Ovechkin	(Russia) HC Dynamo Moscow	
F	9	Alexei Kaigorodov	(Russia) Metallurg Magnitogorsk	Ottawa Senators
F	11	Timofei Shishkanov	(Canada) Quebec Remparts	Nashville Predators
F	13	Nikolai Zherdev	(Russia) HC CSKA Moscow	
F	15	Yuri Trubachyov	(Russia) Severstal Cherepovets	Calgary Flames
F	16	Andrei Taratukhin	(Russia) Avangard Omsk	Calgary Flames
F	18	Alexander Polushin	(Russia) HC CSKA Moscow	Tampa Bay Lightning
F	21	Igor Grigorenko	(Russia) HC Lada Togliatti	Detroit Red Wings
F	23	Yevgeni Artyukhin	(Canada) Moncton Wildcats	Tampa Bay Lightning
F	26	Alexander Perezhogin	(Russia) Avangard Omsk	Montreal Canadiens
F	29	Sergei Anshakov	(Russia) HC CSKA Moscow	Los Angeles Kings

=== United States ===
- Head coach: (United States) Lou Vairo

Pos.	No.	Player	Team	NHL Rights
GK	29	Robert Goepfert	(United States) Providence College	Pittsburgh Penguins
GK	30	Jimmy Howard	(United States) University of Maine	
D	2	Mark Stuart	(United States) Colorado College	
D	3	Matt Jones	(United States) University of North Dakota	Phoenix Coyotes
D	4	Tim Gleason	(Canada) Windsor Spitfires	Ottawa Senators
D	5	Matt Greene	(United States) University of North Dakota	Edmonton Oilers
D	7	Ryan Suter	(United States) USA Hockey National Team Development Program	
D	19	Ryan Whitney	(United States) Boston University	Pittsburgh Penguins
D	20	James Wisniewski	(United States) Plymouth Whalers	Chicago Blackhawks
F	10	Dwight Helminen	(United States) University of Michigan	Edmonton Oilers
F	11	Zach Parise	(United States) University of North Dakota	
F	12	Patrick O'Sullivan	(Canada) Mississauga IceDogs	
F	14	Gino Guyer	(United States) University of Minnesota	
F	15	Greg Moore	(United States) University of Maine	
F	16	Brian McConnell	(United States) Boston University	Calgary Flames
F	17	Ryan Kesler	(United States) Ohio State University	
F	18	Chris Higgins	(United States) Yale University	Montreal Canadiens
F	21	Eric Nystrom	(United States) University of Michigan	Calgary Flames
F	22	Ryan Shannon	(United States) Boston College	
F	23	Dustin Brown	(Canada) Guelph Storm	
F	24	Brett Sterling	(United States) Colorado College	
F	27	Barry Tallackson	(United States) University of Minnesota	New Jersey Devils

=== Slovakia ===
- Head coach: (Slovakia) Robert Spišák

Pos.	No.	Player	Team	NHL Rights
GK	1	Ján Chovan	(United States) Sioux City Musketeers	Toronto Maple Leafs
GK	25	Peter Ševela	(Slovakia) HKm Zvolen	
GK	30	Imrich Petrík	(Slovakia) HK Lietajúce kone Prešov	
D	3	Milan Varga	(Slovakia) HC Košice	
D	5	Peter Maček	(Canada) Montreal Rocket	
D	6	Milan Jurčina	(Canada) Halifax Mooseheads	Boston Bruins
D	7	Richard Stehlík	(Canada) Sherbrooke Castors	
D	8	Dominik Graňák	(Czech Republic) HC Slavia Praha	
D	17	Oliver Maron	(Canada) Belleville Bulls	
D	22	Karol Sloboda	(Canada) Ottawa 67's	
D	27	Tomáš Slovák	(Canada) Kelowna Rockets	Nashville Predators
F	10	Juraj Sýkora	(Slovakia) HC Slovan Bratislava	
F	14	Ivan Koložváry	(Slovakia) HK Dukla Trenčín	Toronto Maple Leafs
F	15	Michal Važan	(Slovakia) MHC Martin	
F	16	Anton Zagora	(Czech Republic) HC Oceláři Třinec	
F	18	Stanislav Valach	(Czech Republic) HC Slavia Praha	
F	19	Samir Saliji	(Slovakia) HK Nitra	
F	20	Rastislav Špirko	(Slovakia) MHC Martin	
F	21	Michal Lukáč	(Canada) Chicoutimi Saguenéens	
F	23	Igor Pohanka	(Canada) Prince Albert Raiders	New Jersey Devils
F	24	Rastislav Lipka	(Canada) Prince Albert Raiders	
F	27	Tomáš Troliga	(Slovakia) HC Košice	St. Louis Blues
F	29	Michal Kokavec	(Czech Republic) HC Oceláři Třinec	

=== Switzerland ===
- Head coach: (Switzerland) Jakob Kölliker

Pos.	No.	Player	Team	NHL Rights
GK	1	Daniel Manzato	(Canada) Victoriaville Tigres	Carolina Hurricanes
GK	30	Tobias Stephan	(Switzerland) Kloten Flyers	Dallas Stars
D	2	Lukas Baumgartner	(Switzerland) Kloten Flyers	
D	3	Jürg Dällenbach	(Switzerland) SCL Tigers	
D	4	Alan Tallarini	(Switzerland) HC Ambrì-Piotta	
D	5	Severin Blindenbacher	(Switzerland) Kloten Flyers	Phoenix Coyotes
D	6	Tim Ramholt	(Switzerland) ZSC Lions	
D	7	Philippe Furrer	(Switzerland) SC Bern	
D	29	Beat Forster	(Switzerland) HC Davos	Phoenix Coyotes
F	10	Andres Ambühl	(Switzerland) HC Davos	
F	11	Patrik Bärtschi	(Switzerland) Kloten Flyers	Pittsburgh Penguins
F	12	Cyrill Bühler	(Switzerland) Kloten Flyers	
F	13	Grégory Christen	(Switzerland) HC Lugano	
F	14	Florian Conz	(Switzerland) HC Ajoie	
F	17	Emanuel Peter	(Switzerland) Kloten Flyers	Calgary Flames
F	18	Kevin Gloor	(Switzerland) EHC Olten	
F	19	Roland Gerber	(Switzerland) SCL Tigers	
F	21	Kevin Romy	(Switzerland) Genève-Servette HC	
F	22	Victor Stăncescu	(Switzerland) Kloten Flyers	
F	23	Stefan Schnyder	(Switzerland) GCK Lions	
F	24	Caryl Neuenschwander	(Switzerland) SC Bern	
F	26	Romano Lemm	(Switzerland) Kloten Flyers	

=== Belarus ===
- Head coach: (Belarus) Vladimir Melenchuk

Pos.	No.	Player	Team	NHL Rights
GK	2	Sergei Rogovsky	(Belarus) HK Gomel	
GK	22	Dmitri Kamovich	(Belarus) HK Vitebsk	
D	3	Andrei Korshunov	(Belarus) Neman Grodno	
D	4	Anatoli Varivonchik	(Belarus) Yunost Minsk	
D	5	Konstantin Durnov	(Belarus) Yunost Minsk	
D	7	Vladimir Denisov	(Belarus) HK Vitebsk	
D	8	Dmitri Parakhonko	(Belarus) HK Vitebsk	
D	27	Dmitri Yudin	(Belarus) Yunost Minsk	
D	28	Artyom Glinkin	(Belarus) Polimir Novopolotsk	
D	30	Andrei Kozachek	(Belarus) Yunost Minsk	
F	9	Vadim Karaga	(Belarus) Polimir Novopolotsk	
F	11	Alexander Kulakov	(Belarus) HK Vitebsk	
F	12	Vasili Gorbovoy	(Belarus) Polimir Novopolotsk	
F	14	Artyom Volkov	(Belarus) Yunost Minsk	
F	15	Alexander Zhidkikh	(Belarus) HK Vitebsk	
F	16	Pavel Kutsevich	(Belarus) Neman Grodno	
F	17	Yevgeni Kashtanov	(Belarus) Yunost Minsk	
F	16	Sergei Khomko	(Belarus) Neman Grodno	
F	21	Konstantin Zakharov	(Belarus) HK Gomel	
F	23	Andrei Kostitsyn	(Russia) HC CSKA Moscow	
F	25	Alexei Yerashov	(Belarus) Yunost Minsk	
F	26	Mikhail Grabovski	(Belarus) Yunost Minsk	

== Group B ==
=== Canada ===
- Head coach: (Canada) Marc Habscheid

Pos.	No.	Player	Team	NHL Rights
GK	1	Marc-André Fleury	(Canada) Cape Breton Screaming Eagles	
GK	31	David LeNeveu	(United States) Cornell University	Phoenix Coyotes
D	2	Steve Eminger	(United States) Washington Capitals	Washington Capitals
D	3	Alexandre Rouleau	(Canada) Quebec Remparts	Pittsburgh Penguins
D	4	Jeff Woywitka	(Canada) Red Deer Rebels	Philadelphia Flyers
D	6	Nathan Paetsch	(Canada) Moose Jaw Warriors	Washington Capitals
D	7	Brendan Bell	(Canada) Ottawa 67's	Toronto Maple Leafs
D	8	Carlo Colaiacovo	(United States) Erie Otters	Toronto Maple Leafs
D	17	Ian White	(Canada) Swift Current Broncos	Toronto Maple Leafs
F	11	Gregory Campbell	(Canada) Kitchener Rangers	Florida Panthers
F	14	Matt Stajan	(Canada) Belleville Bulls	Toronto Maple Leafs
F	15	Joffrey Lupul	(Canada) Medicine Hat Tigers	Mighty Ducks of Anaheim
F	16	Pierre-Marc Bouchard	(United States) Minnesota Wild	Minnesota Wild
F	18	Jay McClement	(Canada) Brampton Battalion	St. Louis Blues
F	19	Scottie Upshall	(Canada) Kamloops Blazers	Nashville Predators
F	20	Daniel Paille	(Canada) Guelph Storm	Buffalo Sabres
F	21	Derek Roy	(Canada) Kitchener Rangers	Buffalo Sabres
F	22	Jordin Tootoo	(Canada) Brandon Wheat Kings	Nashville Predators
F	25	Pierre-Alexandre Parenteau	(Canada) Sherbrooke Castors	Mighty Ducks of Anaheim
F	27	Boyd Gordon	(Canada) Red Deer Rebels	Washington Capitals
F	28	Kyle Wellwood	(Canada) Windsor Spitfires	Toronto Maple Leafs
F	29	Brooks Laich	(United States) Seattle Thunderbirds	Ottawa Senators

=== Finland ===
- Head coach: (Finland) Erkka Westerlund

Pos.	No.	Player	Team	NHL Rights
GK	1	Kari Lehtonen	(Finland) Jokerit	Atlanta Thrashers
GK	30	Tuomas Nissinen	(Finland) Ilves	St. Louis Blues
D	2	Jussi Timonen	(Finland) HC TPS	Philadelphia Flyers
D	3	Topi Jaakola	(Finland) Oulun Kärpät	Florida Panthers
D	4	Joni Pitkänen	(Finland) Oulun Kärpät	Philadelphia Flyers
D	5	Mikko Kalteva	(Finland) Jokerit	Colorado Avalanche
D	18	Matti Näätänen	(Finland) Espoo Blues	
D	19	Teemu Jääskeläinen	(Finland) Ilves	Chicago Blackhawks
D	25	Tuomas Immonen	(Finland) HPK	
D	28	Janne Jalasvaara	(Finland) Espoo Blues	
F	8	Jesse Niinimäki	(Finland) Ilves	Edmonton Oilers
F	10	Sean Bergenheim	(Finland) Jokerit	New York Islanders
F	12	Valtteri Filppula	(Finland) Jokerit	Detroit Red Wings
F	13	Matti Aho	(Finland) HC TPS	
F	14	Tomi Mäki	(Finland) Jokerit	Calgary Flames
F	15	Tuomo Ruutu	(Finland) HIFK	Chicago Blackhawks
F	17	Henrik Juntunen	(Finland) Oulun Kärpät	Los Angeles Kings
F	20	Jussi Jokinen	(Finland) Oulun Kärpät	Dallas Stars
F	21	Juho Lehtisalo	(Finland) HC TPS	
F	22	Tomi Sykkö	(Finland) Kokkolan Hermes	
F	23	Tuomas Mikkonen	(Finland) JYP Jyväskylä	Dallas Stars
F	24	Juha Fagerstedt	(Finland) HIFK	

=== Czech Republic ===
- Head coach: (Czech Republic) Jaroslav Holík

Pos.	No.	Player	Team	NHL Rights
GK	1	Lukáš Mensator	(Canada) Ottawa 67s	Vancouver Canucks
GK	2	Jakub Čech	(Czech Republic) HC Femax Havířov	
GK	30	Martin Falter	(Czech Republic) HC Vítkovice	
D	3	Ladislav Kolda	(Canada) Oshawa Generals	
D	4	Petr Punčochář	(Czech Republic) HC Energie Karlovy Vary	Chicago Blackhawks
D	5	Jiří Svoboda	(Czech Republic) HC Slavia Praha	
D	6	David Turoň	(United States) Portland Winterhawks	Toronto Maple Leafs
D	13	Jan Holub	(Czech Republic) HC Bílí Tygři Liberec	New York Islanders
D	19	Lukáš Chmelíř	(Czech Republic) HC Vítkovice	
D	27	Martin Toms	(Czech Republic) HC Energie Karlovy Vary	
D	29	Lukáš Krajíček	(Canada) Peterborough Petes	Florida Panthers
F	9	Roman Vondráček	(Czech Republic) HC Sparta Praha	
F	10	Petr Tatíček	(Canada) Sault Ste. Marie Greyhounds	Florida Panthers
F	14	Jakub Koreis	(Czech Republic) HC Keramika Plzeň	Phoenix Coyotes
F	15	Milan Michálek	(Czech Republic) HC České Budějovice	
F	16	Zbyněk Novák	(Czech Republic) HC Slavia Praha	Washington Capitals
F	17	Petr Domin	(Czech Republic) HC Energie Karlovy Vary	
F	18	Tomáš Micka	(Czech Republic) HC Femax Havířov	Edmonton Oilers
F	20	Petr Dvorak	(Canada) Regina Pats	Washington Capitals
F	21	Jakub Klepiš	(Czech Republic) HC Slavia Praha	Ottawa Senators
F	23	Tomáš Fleischmann	(Canada) Moose Jaw Warriors	Detroit Red Wings
F	24	Jiří Hudler	(Russia) Ak Bars Kazan	Detroit Red Wings
F	25	Jiří Novotný	(United States) Rochester Americans	Buffalo Sabres

=== Sweden ===
- Head coach: (Sweden) Peo Larsson

Pos.	No.	Player	Team	NHL Rights
GK	1	Mathias Fagerström	(Sweden) Timrå IK	
GK	30	Michal Zajkowski	(Sweden) Modo Hockey	
D	2	Johan Agu	(Sweden) Modo Hockey	
D	3	Patrik Bäärnhielm	(Sweden) Luleå HF	
D	6	Tobias Enström	(Sweden) Modo Hockey	
D	7	Jonas Leetma	(Sweden) Frölunda HC	
D	9	Mats Hansson	(Sweden) Timrå IK	
D	13	Simon Skoog	(Sweden) Mörrums GoIS IK	St. Louis Blues
D	14	Adam Masuhr	(Sweden) Brynäs IF	
D	20	Fredrik Eriksson	(Sweden) Färjestad BK	
F	4	Joakim Lindström	(Sweden) Modo Hockey	Columbus Blue Jackets
F	10	Andreas Falk	(Sweden) Huddinge IK	
F	11	Jonas Almtorp	(Sweden) Modo Hockey	Edmonton Oilers
F	12	Mattias Beck	(Sweden) AIK IF	
F	16	Yared Hagos	(Sweden) AIK IF	Dallas Stars
F	17	Marcus Paulsson	(Canada) Saskatoon Blades	New York Islanders
F	21	Fredrik Sjöström	(Canada) Calgary Hitmen	Phoenix Coyotes
F	22	Andreas Valdix	(Sweden) Malmö Redhawks	
F	24	Alexander Steen	(Sweden) Frölunda HC	Toronto Maple Leafs
F	25	Andrée Brendheden	(Sweden) Tyringe SoSS	
F	28	Andreas Jämtin	(Sweden) AIK IF	Detroit Red Wings
F	29	Robert Nilsson	(Sweden) Leksands IF	

=== Germany ===
- Head coach: (Germany) Ernst Höfner

Pos.	No.	Player	Team	NHL Rights
GK	1	Patrick Ehelechner	(Germany) Hannover Scorpions	
GK	30	Dimitri Pätzold	(Germany) Adler Mannheim	San Jose Sharks
D	6	Alexander Sulzer	(Germany) ESV Kaufbeuren	
D	9	Martin Walter	(Germany) EHC Freiburg	
D	10	Felix Petermann	(Germany) EV Füssen	
D	11	Stefan Schauer	(Germany) Kölner Haie	Ottawa Senators
D	13	David Danner	(Germany) EHC Freiburg	
D	14	Robert Bartlick	(Germany) Lausitzer Füchse	
D	25	Stephan Wilhelm	(Germany) SC Riessersee	
D	26	Dirk Wrobel	(Germany) SC Bietigheim-Bissingen	
F	4	Daniel Menge	(Germany) Tölzer Löwen	
F	7	Marcel Goc	(Germany) Adler Mannheim	San Jose Sharks
F	12	Yannic Seidenberg	(Germany) Adler Mannheim	
F	15	Alexander Barta	(Germany) Eisbären Berlin	
F	16	Kai Hospelt	(Germany) Kölner Haie	
F	18	Adrian Grygiel	(Germany) Krefeld Pinguine	
F	19	Benjamin Barz	(Germany) Landshut Cannibals	
F	22	Martin Hinterstocker	(Germany) SC Riessersee	
F	23	Christoph Ullmann	(Germany) Kölner Haie	
F	24	Josef Menauer	(Germany) Straubing Tigers	
F	27	Maximilian Seyller	(Germany) Landshut Cannibals	
F	28	Marcus Kink	(Germany) Kölner Haie	
