= 2006 WCHA men's ice hockey tournament =

2006 WCHA Men's ice hockey tournament
- Dates: March 10–18, 2006
- Teams: 10
- Finals site: Xcel Energy Center; St. Paul, Minnesota
- Champions: North Dakota (7th title)
- Winning coach: Dave Hakstol (1st title)
- MVP: Jordan Parise (North Dakota)
- Attendance: 87,579
- WCHA Men's Ice Hockey Tournaments

The 2006 WCHA Men's Ice Hockey Tournament was the 47th conference playoff in league history and 52nd season where a WCHA champion was crowned. The 2006 tournament played between March 10 and March 18, 2006 at five conference arenas and the Xcel Energy Center in St. Paul, Minnesota. By winning the tournament, North Dakota was awarded the Broadmoor Trophy and received the Western Collegiate Hockey Association's automatic bid to the 2006 NCAA Men's Division I Ice Hockey Tournament.

== Format ==
The first round of the postseason tournament featured a best-of-three games format. All ten conference teams participated in the tournament. Teams were seeded No. 1 through No. 10 according to their final conference standing, with a tiebreaker system used to seed teams with an identical number of points accumulated. The top five seeded teams each earned home ice and hosted one of the lower seeded teams.

The winners of the first round series advanced to the Xcel Energy Center for the WCHA Final Five, the collective name for the quarterfinal, semifinal, and championship rounds. The Final Five uses a single-elimination format. Teams were re-seeded No. 1 through No. 5 according to the final regular season conference standings, with the top three teams automatically advancing to the semifinals.

=== Conference standings ===
Note: GP = Games played; W = Wins; L = Losses; T = Ties; PTS = Points; GF = Goals For; GA = Goals Against

2005–06 Western Collegiate Hockey Association standings
	Conference							Overall					
	GP	W	L	T	PTS	GF	GA	GP	W	L	T	GF	GA
#8 Minnesota†	28	20	5	3	43	107	64	41	27	9	5	169	105
Denver	28	17	8	3	37	98	78	39	21	15	3	125	110
#1 Wisconsin	28	17	8	3	37	98	60	43	30	10	3	145	79
#3 North Dakota*	28	16	12	0	32	104	76	46	29	16	1	164	109
#11 Colorado College	28	15	11	2	32	94	75	42	24	16	2	143	109
#15 St. Cloud State	28	13	13	2	28	79	62	42	22	16	4	134	99
Minnesota State-Mankato	28	12	13	3	27	93	88	39	17	18	4	126	121
Michigan Tech	28	6	16	6	18	54	113	38	7	25	6	74	149
Minnesota–Duluth	28	6	19	3	15	61	114	40	11	25	4	97	148
Alaska–Anchorage	28	4	21	3	11	51	110	36	6	27	3	68	138
Championship: North Dakota † indicates conference regular season champion * indicates conference tournament champion Final rankings: USA Today/USA Hockey Magazine Top 15 Poll

== Bracket ==
Teams are reseeded after the first round

First round March 10–12, 2006
1	Minnesota	7	6	—
10	Alaska-Anchorage	4	2	—
2	Denver	2	3	2
9	Minnesota-Duluth	3*	2	5
3	Wisconsin	4	1	—
8	Michigan Tech	1	0	—
4	North Dakota	2	4	3
7	Minnesota State	3*	1	0
5	Colorado College	1	3	1
6	St. Cloud State	2	2	3

Quarterfinal; March 16, 2006
6	St. Cloud State	5
9	Minnesota-Duluth	1

Semifinals; March 17, 2006
1	Minnesota	7
6	St. Cloud State	8*
3	Wisconsin	3
4	North Dakota	4

Championship; March 18, 2006
6	St. Cloud State	3
4	North Dakota	5

Note: * denotes overtime period(s)

=== Quarterfinals ===
==== (1) Minnesota vs. (10) Alaska-Anchorage ====
March 10	Minnesota	7 – 4	Alaska-Anchorage	Mariucci Arena	Recap
Ben Gordon - 06:43; Phil Kessel - 07:17		First period	11:09 - PP - Jay Beagle
Ryan Potulny - 04:58; Ryan Potulny - 14:57; Ryan Potulny - GW - 18:31		Second period	05:51 - Brent McMann; 19:14 - Ales Parez
Ben Gordon - 10:35; Ryan Stoa - EN - 19:48		Third period	05:14 - PP - Daron Underwood
Kellen Briggs ( 24 saves / 28 shots )		Goalie stats	John DeCaro ( 45 saves / 51 shots )

March 11	Minnesota	6 – 2	Alaska-Anchorage	Mariucci Arena	Recap
Phil Kessel - 04:38; Blake Wheeler - PP - 07:23; Ryan Stoa - GW PP - 15:13		First period	No scoring
Ryan Stoa - 09:11		Second period	17:01 - Eric Walsky
Phil Kessel - PP - 11:08; Blake Wheeler - 18:20		Third period	15:54 - Justin Bourne
Kellen Briggs ( 18 saves / 20 shots )		Goalie stats	Nathan Lawson ( 27 saves / 31 shots ) / John DeCaro ( 18 saves / 20 shots )

Minnesota won series 2–0

==== (2) Denver vs. (9) Minnesota-Duluth ====
March 10	Denver	2 – 3	OT	Minnesota-Duluth	Magness Arena	Recap
Paul Stastny - PP - 01:25		First period		15:06 - PP - Andrew Carroll
No Scoring		Second period		No scoring
Paul Stastny - PP - 04:02		Third period		02:36 - Andrew Carroll
No Scoring		First overtime period		01:25 - GW - MacGregor Sharp
Glenn Fisher ( 15 saves / 18 shots )		Goalie stats		Nate Ziegelmann ( 27 saves / 29 shots )

March 11	Denver	3 – 2	Minnesota-Duluth	Magness Arena	Recap
Ryan Dingle - 14:56		First period	No scoring
Ryan Dingle - 02:16		Second period	19:31 - PP - Jason Garrison
Ryan Helgason - GW - 15:31		Third period	05:45 - Michael Gergen
Peter Mannino ( 29 saves / 31 shots )		Goalie stats	Nate Ziegelmann ( 27 saves / 30 shots )

March 12	Denver	5 – 2	Minnesota-Duluth	Magness Arena	Recap
Paul Stastny - PP - 09:41		First period	No scoring
No Scoring		Second period	12:17 - PP - Tim Stapleton; 13:27 - PP - Josh Meyers; 13:57 - GW - Michael Gergen; 16:02 - Jason Garrison
Gabe Gauthier - EA - 15:06		Third period	19:31 - EN - Andrew Carroll
Peter Mannino ( 14 saves / 18 shots ) / Glenn Fisher ( 8 saves / 8 shots )		Goalie stats	Nate Ziegelmann ( 33 saves / 35 shots )

Minnesota-Duluth won series 2–1

==== (3) Wisconsin vs. (8) Michigan Tech ====
March 10	Wisconsin	4 – 1	Michigan Tech	Kohl Center	Recap
Robbie Earl - 06:03; A.J. Degenhardt - GW - 10:39; Jack Skille - PP - 16:17		First period	08:48 - Geoff Kinrade
Matthew Ford - 19:12		Second period	No scoring
No scoring		Third period	No scoring
Brian Elliott ( 21 saves / 22 shots )		Goalie stats	Michael Teslak ( 13 saves / 16 shots ) / Rob Nolan ( 29 saves / 30 shots )

March 11	Wisconsin	1 – 0	Michigan Tech	Kohl Center	Recap
No Scoring		First period	No scoring
Joe Pavelski - GW PP - 06:49		Second period	No scoring
No scoring		Third period	No scoring
Brian Elliott ( 19 saves / 19 shots )		Goalie stats	Michael Teslak ( 29 saves / 30 shots )

Wisconsin won series 2–0

==== (4) North Dakota vs. (7) Minnesota State ====
March 10	North Dakota	2 – 3	OT	Minnesota State	Ralph Engelstad Arena	Recap
No Scoring		First period		No scoring
Travis Zajac - PP - 05:55		Second period		06:30 - David Backes; 19:31 - Travis Morin
Matt Watkins - 05:22		Third period		No scoring
No Scoring		First overtime period		05:22 - GW - Rob Rankin
Jordan Parise ( 33 saves / 36 shots )		Goalie stats		Dan Tormey ( 29 saves / 31 shots )

March 11	North Dakota	4 – 1	Minnesota State	Ralph Engelstad Arena	Recap
Jonathan Toews - 12:40; T. J. Oshie - GW - 13:36		First period	No scoring
T. J. Oshie - 05:39		Second period	15:50 - PP - Kyle Peto
Travis Zajac - PP - 10:25		Third period	No scoring
Jordan Parise ( 25 saves / 26 shots )		Goalie stats	Dan Tormey ( 27 saves / 31 shots )

March 12	North Dakota	3 – 0	Minnesota State	Ralph Engelstad Arena	Recap
Chris Porter - GW - 00:47; Travis Zajac - PP - 07:17		First period	No scoring
Travis Zajac - PP - 08:28		Second period	No scoring
No scoring		Third period	No scoring
Jordan Parise ( 32 saves / 32 shots )		Goalie stats	Dan Tormey ( 22 saves / 25 shots )

North Dakota won series 2–1

==== (5) Colorado College vs. (6) St. Cloud State ====
March 10	Colorado College	1 – 2	St. Cloud State	Colorado Springs World Arena	Recap
Jimmy Kilpatrick - 06:10		First period	09:06 - Konrad Reeder
No Scoring		Second period	01:27 - GW SH - Michael Olson
No scoring		Third period	No scoring
Matt Zaba ( 32 saves / 34 shots )		Goalie stats	Bobby Goepfert ( 25 saves / 26 shots )

March 11	Colorado College	3 – 2	St. Cloud State	Colorado Springs World Arena	Recap
No Scoring		First period	08:37 - Matt Hartman
Brian Salcido - 15:07; Brett Sterling - PP - 15:51		Second period	05:14 - PP - Aaron Brocklehurst
Brett Sterling - GW - 11:28		Third period	No scoring
Matt Zaba ( 29 saves / 31 shots )		Goalie stats	Bobby Goepfert ( 33 saves / 36 shots )

March 12	Colorado College	1 – 3	St. Cloud State	Colorado Springs World Arena	Recap
No Scoring		First period	No scoring
No Scoring		Second period	07:25 - Dan Kronick
Brett Sterling - PP - 00:11		Third period	06:50 - GW - Nate Raduns; 15:29 - Matt Stephenson
Matt Zaba ( 22 saves / 25 shots )		Goalie stats	Bobby Goepfert ( 31 saves / 32 shots )

St. Cloud State won series 2–1

=== Quarterfinal ===
==== (6) St. Cloud State vs. (9) Minnesota-Duluth ====
March 16	St. Cloud State	5 – 1	Minnesota-Duluth	Xcel Energy Center	Recap
Billy Hengen - 00:44; Nate Dey - GW - 03:18; Brock Hooton - PP - 12:55		First period	13:56 - Tim Stapleton
No Scoring		Second period	No scoring
Andrew Gordon - 00:48; Billy Hengen - EN - 17:34		Third period	No scoring
Bobby Goepfert ( 36 saves / 37 shots )		Goalie stats	Nate Ziegelmann ( 21 saves / 25 shots )

=== Semifinals ===
==== (1) Minnesota vs. (6) St. Cloud State ====
March 17	Minnesota	7 – 8	OT	St. Cloud State	Xcel Energy Center	Recap
Ben Gordon - 09:36; Alex Goligoski - 13:33		First period		10:57 - Matt Hartman; 15:02 - PP - Justin Fletcher
Ryan Potunly - PP - 09:43; Ryan Potunly - 14:08; Ryan Potunly - PP - 19:59		Second period		00:58 - Andrew Gordon; 03:50 - Casey Borer; 05:54 - T. J. McElroy; 11:40 - Brock Hooton
Danny Irmen - 17:59; Ryan Potunly - EA - 19:45		Third period		16:21 - Brock Hooton
No Scoring		First overtime period		09:14 - GW - Matt Hartman
Kellen Briggs ( 17 saves / 22 shots ) / Jeff Frazee ( 13 saves / 16 shots )		Goalie stats		Bobby Goepfert ( 44 saves / 51 shots )

==== (3) Wisconsin vs. (4) North Dakota ====
March 17	Wisconsin	3 – 4	North Dakota	Xcel Energy Center	Recap
Joe Pavelski - 07:43; Andy Brandt - 11:05		First period	18:07 - Ryan Duncan; 19:02 - Rylan Kaip
Robbie Earl - PP - 18:59		Second period	04:10 - Rastislav Spirko; 18:24 - GW - Rylan Kaip
No scoring		Third period	No scoring
Brian Elliott ( 27 saves / 31 shots )		Goalie stats	Jordan Parise ( 27 saves / 30 shots )

=== Third Place ===
==== (1) Minnesota vs. (3) Wisconsin ====
March 18	Minnesota	0 – 4	Wisconsin	Xcel Energy Center	Recap
No Scoring		First period	03:30 - GW - Andrew Joudrey
No scoring		Second period	10:07 - Jack Skille
No scoring		Third period	03:02 - PP - Ross Carlson; 10:58 - Robbie Earl
Kellen Briggs ( 26 saves / 30 shots )		Goalie stats	Brian Elliott ( 26 saves / 26 shots )

=== Championship ===
==== (4) North Dakota vs. (6) St. Cloud State ====
March 18	North Dakota	5 – 3	St. Cloud State	Xcel Energy Center	Recap
Rastislav Spirko - 04:00; Jonathan Toews - 04:15; T. J. Oshie - PP - 17:41		First period	03:50 - PP - Konrad Reeder
Ryan Duncan - GW - 04:58; Ryan Duncan - PP - 13:41		Second period	16:20 - PP - Brock Hooton
No scoring		Third period	05:07 - Billy Hengen
Jordan Parise ( 37 saves / 40 shots )		Goalie stats	Bobby Goepfert ( 24 saves / 29 shots )

== Tournament awards ==
=== All-Tournament Team ===
- F Brock Hooton (St. Cloud State)
- F T. J. Oshie (North Dakota)
- F Ryan Potulny (Minnesota)
- D Kyle Klubertanz (Wisconsin)
- D Matt Smaby (North Dakota)
- G Jordan Parise* (North Dakota)

* Most Valuable Player(s)

== See also ==
- Western Collegiate Hockey Association men's champions
