= 2005 WCHA men's ice hockey tournament =

2005 WCHA Men's ice hockey tournament
- Dates: March 11–19, 2005
- Teams: 10
- Finals site: Xcel Energy Center; St. Paul, Minnesota
- Champions: Denver (14th title)
- Winning coach: George Gwozdecky (3rd title)
- MVP: Brett Sterling (Colorado College)
- Attendance: 77,746
- WCHA Men's Ice Hockey Tournaments

The 2005 WCHA Men's Ice Hockey Tournament was the 46th conference playoff in league history and 51st season where a WCHA champion was crowned. The 2005 tournament was played between March 11 and March 19, 2005, at five conference arenas and the Xcel Energy Center in St. Paul, Minnesota. By winning the tournament, Denver was awarded the Broadmoor Trophy and received the WCHA's automatic bid to the NCAA Tournament.

== Format ==
The first round of the postseason tournament featured a best-of-three games format. All ten conference schools participated in the tournament with teams seeded No. 1 through No. 10 according to their final conference standing, with a tiebreaker system used to seed teams with an identical number of points accumulated. The top five seeded teams each earned home ice and hosted one of the lower seeded teams.

The winners of the first round series advanced to the Xcel Energy Center for the WCHA Final Five, the collective name for the quarterfinal, semifinal, and championship rounds. The Final Five uses a single-elimination format. Teams were re-seeded No. 1 through No. 5 according to the final regular season conference standings, with the top three teams automatically advancing to the semifinals.

=== Conference standings ===
Note: PTS = Points; GP = Games played; W = Wins; L = Losses; T = Ties; GF = Goals For; GA = Goals Against

2004–05 Western Collegiate Hockey Association standings
	Conference							Overall					
	GP	W	L	T	PTS	GF	GA	GP	W	L	T	GF	GA
#1 Denver†*	28	19	7	2	40	114	81	43	32	9	2	174	110
#2 Colorado College†	28	19	7	2	40	98	66	43	31	9	3	160	101
#4 Minnesota	28	17	10	1	35	105	80	44	28	15	1	155	109
#13 Wisconsin	28	16	9	3	35	94	64	41	23	14	4	127	91
#3 North Dakota	28	13	12	3	29	71	67	45	25	15	5	136	103
Minnesota–Duluth	28	11	13	4	26	90	89	38	15	17	6	119	118
Alaska–Anchorage	28	9	15	4	22	72	102	37	12	19	6	94	129
Minnesota State–Mankato	28	8	16	4	20	82	109	38	13	19	6	118	140
St. Cloud State	28	8	19	1	17	66	100	40	14	23	3	109	126
Michigan Tech	28	7	19	2	16	64	98	37	8	25	4	91	136
Championship: Denver † indicates conference regular season champion * indicates conference tournament champion Final rankings: USA Today/USA Hockey Magazine Top 15 Poll

== Bracket ==
Teams are reseeded after the first round

First round March 11–13
1	Denver	7	1	—
10	Michigan Tech	1	0	—
2	Colorado College	8	4	–
9	St. Cloud State	2	2	–
3	Minnesota	7	5	–
8	Minnesota State	2	3	–
4	Wisconsin	5	1	2
7	Alaska-Anchorage	4	2	1
5	North Dakota	8	6	–
6	Minnesota-Duluth	2	1	–

Quarterfinal; March 17
4	Wisconsin	1
5	North Dakota	3

Semifinals; March 18
1	Denver	2*
5	North Dakota	1
2	Colorado College	3
3	Minnesota	0

Championship; March 19
1	Denver	1
2	Colorado College	0

Note: * denotes overtime period(s)

=== First round ===
==== (1) Denver vs. (10) Michigan Tech ====
March 11	Denver	7 – 1	Michigan Tech	Magness Arena	Recap
Ryan Helgason – 10:30 (Halme, Corbin) Ryan Dingle – GW SH – 18:01		First period	15:10 – Chris Connor (Desmet, Wilson)
(Helgason, Stastny) Gabe Gauthier - 08:41 (Drummond, Laatsch) Gabe Gauthier - 17:05		Second period	No scoring
(Dingle) Paul Stastny - 06:26 (Handza, Thomas) Ryan Helgason - 08:30 (Dingle, Fulghum) Paul Stastny - 09:24		Third period	No scoring
( 11 saves / 12 shots ) Glenn Fisher		Goalie stats	Cam Ellsworth ( 22 saves / 27 shots ) / Bryce Luker ( 6 saves / 8 shots )

March 12	Denver	1 – 0	Michigan Tech	Magness Arena	Recap
No Scoring		First period	No scoring
No scoring		Second period	No scoring
(Gauthier, Handza) Adrian Veidman – GW – 18:02		Third period	No scoring
( 24 saves / 24 shots ) Peter Mannino		Goalie stats	Cam Ellsworth ( 45 saves / 46 shots )

Denver won series 2–0

==== (2) Colorado College vs. (9) St. Cloud State ====
March 11	Colorado College	8 – 2	St. Cloud State	World Arena, Colorado Springs	Recap
(Polaski, Hillen) Marty Sertich – 01:22 (Polaski, Sweatt) Brett Sterling – 07:05 (Cox) Aaron Slattengren – GW – 11:03 (Kilpatrick) Aaron Slattengren – 13:54		First period	03:19 – PP – Nate Raduns (Gordon, Jensen)
(Polich, Frischmon) Mark Stuart – PP – 02:31 (Sterling, Hillen) James Brannigan – 05:04 (Sertich, Crabb) Brett Sterling – PP – 13:32		Second period	No scoring
James Brannigan – 17:18		Third period	No scoring
( 34 saves / 38 shots ) Curtis McElhinney		Goalie stats	Tim Boron ( 25 saves / 29 shots ) / Jason Montgomery ( 12 saves / 16 shots )

March 12	Colorado College	4 – 2	St. Cloud State	World Arena, Colorado Springs	Recap
(Polaski) Brett Sterling – 11:51		First period	11:01 – Konrad Reeder (Jensen, Borer)
No scoring		Second period	13:34 – PP – Justin Fletcher (Hengen, Gens)
(Frischmon) Mark Stuart – 02:20 (Sterling, Salcido) Joey Crabb – GW PP – 10:19 (Slattengren, Stuart) Jimmy Kilpatrick – 10:38		Third period	No scoring
( 27 saves / 29 shots ) Matt Zaba		Goalie stats	Tim Boron ( 27 saves / 31 shots )

Colorado College won series 2–0

==== (3) Minnesota vs. (8) Minnesota State ====
March 11	Minnesota	7 – 2	Minnesota State	Mariucci Arena	Recap
(Stevens, Sertich) Garrett Smaagaard – 03:59 (Hirsch, Sertich) Evan Kaufmann – 06:38 (Hagemo, Stevens) Barry Tallackson – GW – 14:12 (Guyer) Kris Chucko – 19:00		First period	03:02 – Christian Toll (McKelvie, Brenk); 05:54 – PP – Brad Thompson (Morin)
(Potulny, Goligoski) Danny Irmen – PP – 03:39 (Vannelli, Guyer) Barry Tallackson – 15:27 (Vannelli, Peltier) Danny Irmen – PP – 19:48		Second period	No scoring
No scoring		Third period	No scoring
( 25 saves / 27 shots ) Justin Johnson		Goalie stats	Jon Volp ( 27 saves / 34 shots )

March 12	Minnesota	5 – 3	Minnesota State	Mariucci Arena	Recap
(Fleming) Jerrid Reinholz – 14:54		First period	No scoring
(Hirsch, Goligoski) Danny Irmen – 08:01 (Stevens, Fleming) P.J. Atherton – 12:56 (Irmen, Vannelli) Mike Howe – 14:41		Second period	00:57 – Adam Gerlach (Thompson); 10:14 – PP – Brad Thompson (Brenk, Backes); 14:08 – PP – Jake Brenk (Thompson, Morin)
(Harrington) Barry Tallackson – 14:24		Third period	No scoring
( 25 saves / 28 shots ) Justin Johnson		Goalie stats	Chris Clark ( 31 saves / 36 shots )

Minnesota won series 2–0

==== (4) Wisconsin vs. (7) Alaska-Anchorage ====
March 11	Wisconsin	5 – 4	Alaska-Anchorage	Veterans Memorial Coliseum	Recap
(Engel, Earl) Joe Pavelski – 00:46 (Gilbert, Joudrey) Joe Pavelski – PP – 04:30		First period	No scoring
No scoring		Second period	07:05 – Chris Tarkir (Cartwright); 11:15 – Martin Stuchlik (Johnson)
(Pavelski, MacMurchy) Robbie Earl – PP – 05:01 (Piskula, Pavelski) Robbie Earl – 13:11 (Licari, Likens) Adam Burish – GW – 16:40		Third period	01:29 – PP – Martin Stuchlik (Bourne, Segal); 02:51 – SH – Brent McMann
( 16 saves / 20 shots ) Bernd Brückler / ( 4 saves / 4 shots ) Brian Elliott		Goalie stats	John DeCaro ( 2 saves / 4 shots ) / Nathan Lawson ( 45 saves / 48 shots )

March 12	Wisconsin	1 – 2	Alaska-Anchorage	Veterans Memorial Coliseum	Recap
No Scoring		First period	09:52 – SH – Justin Johnson (Polaski, Sweatt)
(Earl, MacMurchy) Joe Pavelski – 00:59		Second period	09:35 – GW – Shea Hamilton (Segal, Bourne)
No scoring		Third period	No scoring
( 21 saves / 23 shots ) Brian Elliott		Goalie stats	Nathan Lawson ( 44 saves / 45 shots )

March 13	Wisconsin	2 – 1	Alaska-Anchorage	Veterans Memorial Coliseum	Recap
No Scoring		First period	08:39 – PP – Chad Anderson (Waldrop, Segal)
(Piskula) Joe Pavelski – 07:13 (Licari, Degenhardt) Adam Burish – GW – 11:13		Second period	No scoring
No scoring		Third period	No scoring
( 27 saves / 28 shots ) Bernd Brückler		Goalie stats	Nathan Lawson ( 37 saves / 39 shots )

Wisconsin won series 2–1

==== (5) North Dakota vs. (6) Minnesota-Duluth ====
March 11	North Dakota	8 – 2	Minnesota-Duluth	Ralph Engelstad Arena	Recap
(McMahon, Špirko) Colby Genoway – 03:12 (Murray, Genoway) Travis Zajac – 13:02 (Genoway, Bina) Rastislav Špirko – GW – 16:15 (Murray) Matt Jones – 17:59		First period	No scoring
(Canady, Massen) Erik Fabian – 02:22		Second period	08:02 – Tim Stapleton (Hambly, Schwabe)
(Zajac) Erik Fabian – 05:21 (Massen, Fabian) Rory McMahon – 07:57 (McMahon, Špirko) Colby Genoway – 09:14		Third period	15:24 – Matt McKnight (Peluso, Stapleton)
( 17 saves / 19 shots ) Jordan Parise		Goalie stats	Isaac Reichmuth ( 10 saves / 14 shots ) / Josh Johnson ( 12 saves / 16 shots )

March 12	North Dakota	6 – 1	Minnesota-Duluth	Ralph Engelstad Arena	Recap
No Scoring		First period	15:22 – Tim Stapleton
(McMahon) Rastislav Špirko – 02:30; Rory McMahon – GW – 05:02 (Stafford, Zajac) Colby Genoway – PP – 09:39 (Jones) Brian Canady -09:58		Second period	No scoring
(McMahon, Schneider) Rastislav Špirko – 11:31 (McMahon, Špirko) Nick Fuher – PP – 18:12		Third period	No scoring
( 17 saves / 18 shots ) Jordan Parise		Goalie stats	Isaac Reichmuth ( 17 saves / 21 shots ) / Josh Johnson ( 8 saves / 10 shots )

North Dakota won series 2–0

=== Quarterfinal ===
==== (4) Wisconsin vs. (5) North Dakota ====
March 17	Wisconsin	2 – 3	North Dakota	Xcel Energy Center	Recap
(Pavelski, Carlson) Robbie Earl – 09:21		First period	01:22 – Brady Murray (Zajac, Stafford); 14:08 – James Massen (Canady, Fabian)
No scoring		Second period	No scoring
Adam Burish – 10:43		Third period	09:44 – GW PP – Colby Genoway (Špirko, Fuher)
( 25 saves / 28 shots ) Bernd Brückler		Goalie stats	Jordan Parise ( 33 saves / 35 shots )

=== Semifinals ===
==== (1) Denver vs. (8) North Dakota ====
March 18	Denver	2 – 1	OT	North Dakota	Xcel Energy Center	Recap
(Stastny, Carle) Gabe Gauthier - PP - 04:29		First period		10:03 – PP – Nick Fuher (Murray)
No scoring		Second period		No scoring
No scoring		Third period		No scoring
(Veideman) Gabe Gauthier – GW – 00:42		First overtime period		No scoring
( 29 saves / 30 shots ) Glenn Fisher		Goalie stats		Philippe Lamoureux ( 30 saves / 32 shots )

==== (2) Colorado College vs. (3) Minnesota ====
March 18	Colorado College	3 – 0	Minnesota	Xcel Energy Center	Recap
No Scoring		First period	No scoring
(Hillen, McElhinney) Brett Sterling – GW – 01:57 (Sterling) Aaron Slattengren – PP – 06:46		Second period	No scoring
Brett Sterling – PP – 04:55		Third period	No scoring
( 32 saves / 32 shots ) Curtis McElhinney		Goalie stats	Justin Johnson ( 19 saves / 22 shots )

=== Third Place ===
==== (3) Minnesota vs. (5) North Dakota ====
March 19	Minnesota	2 – 4	North Dakota	Xcel Energy Center	Recap
(Potulny, Howe) Danny Irmen – 10:30		First period	09:23 – Quinn Fylling (Foyt)
(Gordon, Harrington) Mike Howe – PP – 06:04		Second period	10:56 – SH – Rastislav Špirko (Fylling)
No scoring		Third period	03:03 – Matt Greene (Marvin, Stafford); 18:12 – Nick Fuher
( 18 saves / 22 shots ) Kellen Briggs		Goalie stats	Jordan Parise ( 25 saves / 27 shots )

=== Championship ===
==== (1) Denver vs. (2) Colorado College ====
March 19	Denver	1 – 0	Colorado College	Xcel Energy Center	Recap
No Scoring		First period	No scoring
(Carle) Luke Fulghum – GW PP – 16:56		Second period	No scoring
No scoring		Third period	No scoring
( 25 saves / 25 shots ) Peter Mannino		Goalie stats	Curtis McElhinney ( 26 saves / 27 shots )

== Tournament awards ==
=== All-Tournament Team ===
- F Rastislav Špirko (North Dakota)
- F Brett Sterling* (Colorado College)
- F Gabe Gauthier (Denver)
- D Nick Fuher (North Dakota)
- D Matt Laasch (Denver)
- G Curtis McElhinney (Colorado College)

* Most Valuable Player(s)

== See also ==
- Western Collegiate Hockey Association men's champions
