= Andrew Carroll (disambiguation) =

Andrew Carroll (born 1969) is an American author.

Andrew Carroll may also refer to:

- Andrew Carroll (ice hockey) (1985–2018), American professional ice hockey player
- Andy Carroll (born 1989), English footballer
- Andy Carroll (Australian footballer) (1906–1970), Australian rules footballer
- Andy Carroll (River City), fictional character
