= Radmall =

Radmall is a surname. Notable people with the surname include:

- Adam Radmall (born 1984), English professional ice hockey player
- Lucy, Lady Houston (born Fanny Lucy Radmall, 1857–1936), British philanthropist, political activist and suffragette

== See also ==
- Meanings of minor planet names: 17001–18000#881
