= Chad Anderson =

Chad Anderson may refer to:

- Chad Anderson (ice hockey) (born 1982), American ice hockey defenseman
- Chad Anderson (politician) (born 1979), member of the Minnesota House of Representatives
