= Nathan Lawson =

Nathan Lawson may refer to:

- Nathan Lawson (ice hockey) (born 1983), Canadian ice hockey player
- Nathan Lawson (rugby union) (born 1999), Australian rugby player
