= Adam Radmall =

English ice hockey player (born 1984)

- Born: 17 February 1984 (age 42) Nottingham, England
- Height: 5 ft 10 in (178 cm)
- Weight: 185 lb (84 kg; 13 st 3 lb)
- Position: Defence
- Shoots: Left
- EIPHL team Former teams: Sheffield Steeldogs; Manchester Phoenix; Milton Keynes Lightning
- Playing career: 2000–present

Adam Radmall (born 17 February 1984) is an English professional ice hockey player, currently playing for the Milton Keynes Lightning in the EIPHL. Radmall began his career playing for his local team, the Nottingham Lions of the ENL, Northern Section. In his first season, Radmall managed to play 19 games and total 16 points, an impressive return for a young defenseman.

Adam attended Top Valley Comprehensive School from 1995 to 2000 and grew up in the Rise Park area of the city. He has one brother, Sean, as well as a sister, called Ella.

His excellent start led to Radmall's call-up for the national U-18 team – he would total seven caps over the 2000/01 and 2001/02 seasons. Radmall would play for the Lions for the 2001/02 season, but in 2002/03 was signed by the Coventry Blaze, then playing at BNL level, a significant step up for the young man. He managed it without a problem, though, making 31 appearances in his first season with the Blaze. A further step up would follow with the Blaze's move to play in the new EIHL, founded as the top level of club hockey in the U.K.

Again, Radmall adjusted well and featured in 50 regular-season games and four postseason encounters. His excellent performances led to his move to the Hull Stingrays, at BNL level for the 2004/05 season and then at ENL for the following term. Midway through his second season with the Stingrays, Radmall was snapped up by the Nottingham Panthers, where he would make a return to the now well-established EIHL.

Radmall would continue at the higher level for the following season, but moved further north, signing for the Manchester Phoenix under player/coach Tony Hand. Radmall was a solid player for the Phoenix, but only managed to score one point in 55 appearances. Due to this lack of offensive production, he was released by the Phoenix at the end of the season. Radmall took the opportunity to sign for the Milton Keynes Lightning of the EPL along with former Phoenix team-mate Ales Parez.

Radmall and Parez were both re-signed by the Lightning in the summer of 2008.

Radmall now plays for the newly-named Sheffield Steeldogs, which he joined in September 2010.
