= Matt Smaby =

American ice hockey player

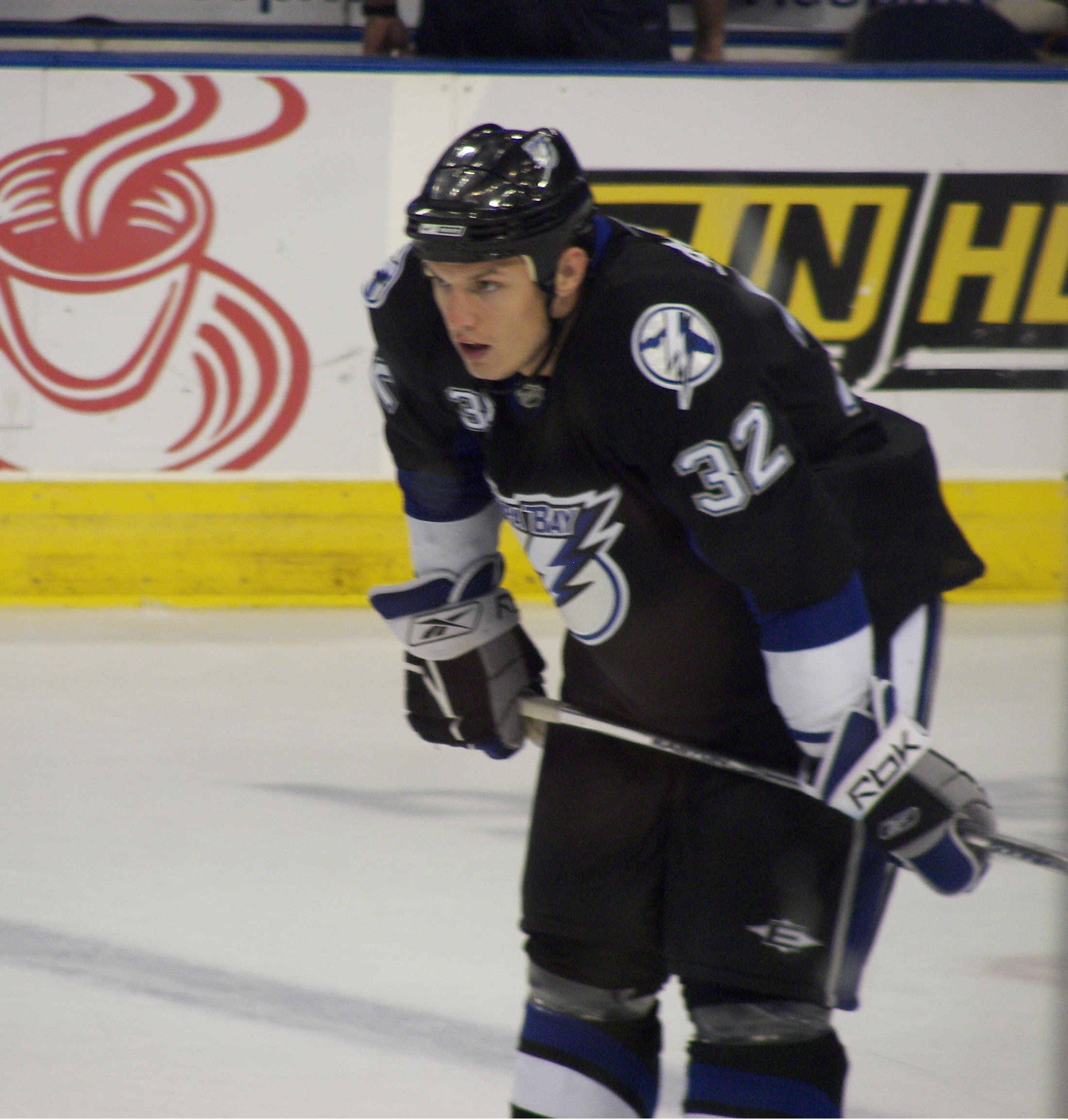
- Smaby with the Tampa Bay Lightning in 2007
- Born: October 14, 1984 (age 42) Minneapolis, Minnesota, U.S.
- Height: 6 ft 5 in (196 cm)
- Weight: 240 lb (109 kg; 17 st 2 lb)
- Position: Defense
- Shot: Left
- Played for: Tampa Bay Lightning; EHC München
- NHL draft: 41st overall, 2003; Tampa Bay Lightning
- Playing career: 2006–2017; Coaching career

Current position
- Title: Associate Head Coach
- Team: North Dakota

Biographical details
- Education: University of North Dakota

Coaching career (HC unless noted)
- 2017–2019: North Dakota (Student manager)
- 2019–2020: EC Salzburg (Assistant coach)
- 2021–2025: Waterloo Black Hawks
- 2025–present: North Dakota (Associate head coach)

Matthew Walker Smaby (born October 14, 1984) is an American coach and former professional ice hockey defenseman who is currently the associate head coach of the North Dakota Fighting Hawks men's ice hockey team.

== Career ==
Smaby was drafted 41st overall in the 2003 NHL entry draft by the Tampa Bay Lightning. Smaby had a three-year collegiate career with the University of North Dakota. He made his professional debut during the 2006–07 season playing for the Springfield Falcons of the American Hockey League (AHL). Smaby made his National Hockey League (NHL) debut in the 2007–08 season playing 14 games with the Lightning.

Smaby played five years with the Tampa Bay Lightning organization. He did not receive a qualifying offer from Tampa Bay after the 2010–11 season and became an unrestricted free agent. On July 14, 2011, Smaby signed a one-year contract with the Anaheim Ducks.

On June 6, 2013, Smaby signed his first European contract on a one-year deal with EHC München of the German Deutsche Eishockey Liga (DEL). Prior to the 2014–15 season, Smaby signed a professional tryout contract with the Arizona Coyotes but was released on October 4, 2014, and returned to EHC München. In 2015, München extended Smaby's contract though the 2016–17 season.

Smaby retired from playing in 2017 and returned to the University of North Dakota to earn his degree while rejoining his collegiate team, the University of North Dakota Fighting Hawks, as team manager. After earning his degree in 2019, he returned to Europe as an assistant coach with EC Red Bull Salzburg of Erste Bank Eishockey Liga (EBEL). Due to the COVID-19 pandemic, Smaby returned to the United States in 2020 and coached youth hockey in Grand Forks, North Dakota. On July 27, 2021, he was hired as the head coach of the Waterloo Black Hawks, a Tier I junior team in the United States Hockey League (USHL). On May 21, 2025 after the conclusion of the 2024–25 USHL season in which Smaby led the Waterloo Black Hawks to the Clark Cup finals, he was named North Dakota's associate head coach.

== Career statistics ==
			Regular season					Playoffs
Season	Team	League	GP	G	A	Pts	PIM	GP	G	A	Pts	PIM
2001–02	Shattuck–Saint Mary's	HSMN	65	7	18	25	134	—	—	—	—	—
2002–03	Shattuck–Saint Mary's	HSMN	57	3	20	23	114	—	—	—	—	—
2003–04	University of North Dakota	WCHA	39	1	6	7	81	—	—	—	—	—
2004–05	University of North Dakota	WCHA	42	1	2	3	86	—	—	—	—	—
2005–06	University of North Dakota	WCHA	46	4	15	19	113	—	—	—	—	—
2006–07	Springfield Falcons	AHL	66	2	14	16	43	—	—	—	—	—
2007–08	Norfolk Admirals	AHL	58	1	5	6	66	—	—	—	—	—
2007–08	Tampa Bay Lightning	NHL	14	0	0	0	12	—	—	—	—	—
2008–09	Norfolk Admirals	AHL	25	2	4	6	30	—	—	—	—	—
2008–09	Tampa Bay Lightning	NHL	43	0	4	4	50	—	—	—	—	—
2009–10	Tampa Bay Lightning	NHL	33	0	2	2	27	—	—	—	—	—
2009–10	Norfolk Admirals	AHL	7	0	2	2	9	—	—	—	—	—
2010–11	Tampa Bay Lightning	NHL	32	0	0	0	17	—	—	—	—	—
2011–12	Syracuse Crunch	AHL	30	2	7	9	46	—	—	—	—	—
2012–13	Norfolk Admirals	AHL	26	0	4	4	16	—	—	—	—	—
2013–14	EHC Red Bull München	DEL	42	3	13	16	64	3	0	0	0	10
2014–15	EHC Red Bull München	DEL	31	1	3	4	56	4	0	0	0	18
2015–16	EHC Red Bull München	DEL	42	0	7	7	60	14	2	1	3	20
2016–17	EHC Red Bull München	DEL	42	5	9	14	97	14	0	1	1	12
AHL totals			212	7	36	43	210	—	—	—	—	—
NHL totals			122	0	6	6	106	—	—	—	—	—
DEL totals			157	9	32	41	277	35	2	2	4	60

== Awards and honors ==
Award	Year
All-WCHA Third Team	2005–06
WCHA All-Tournament Team	2006
WCHA All-Academic Team	2005-06
