= Kyle Klubertanz =

American ice hockey player (born 1985)

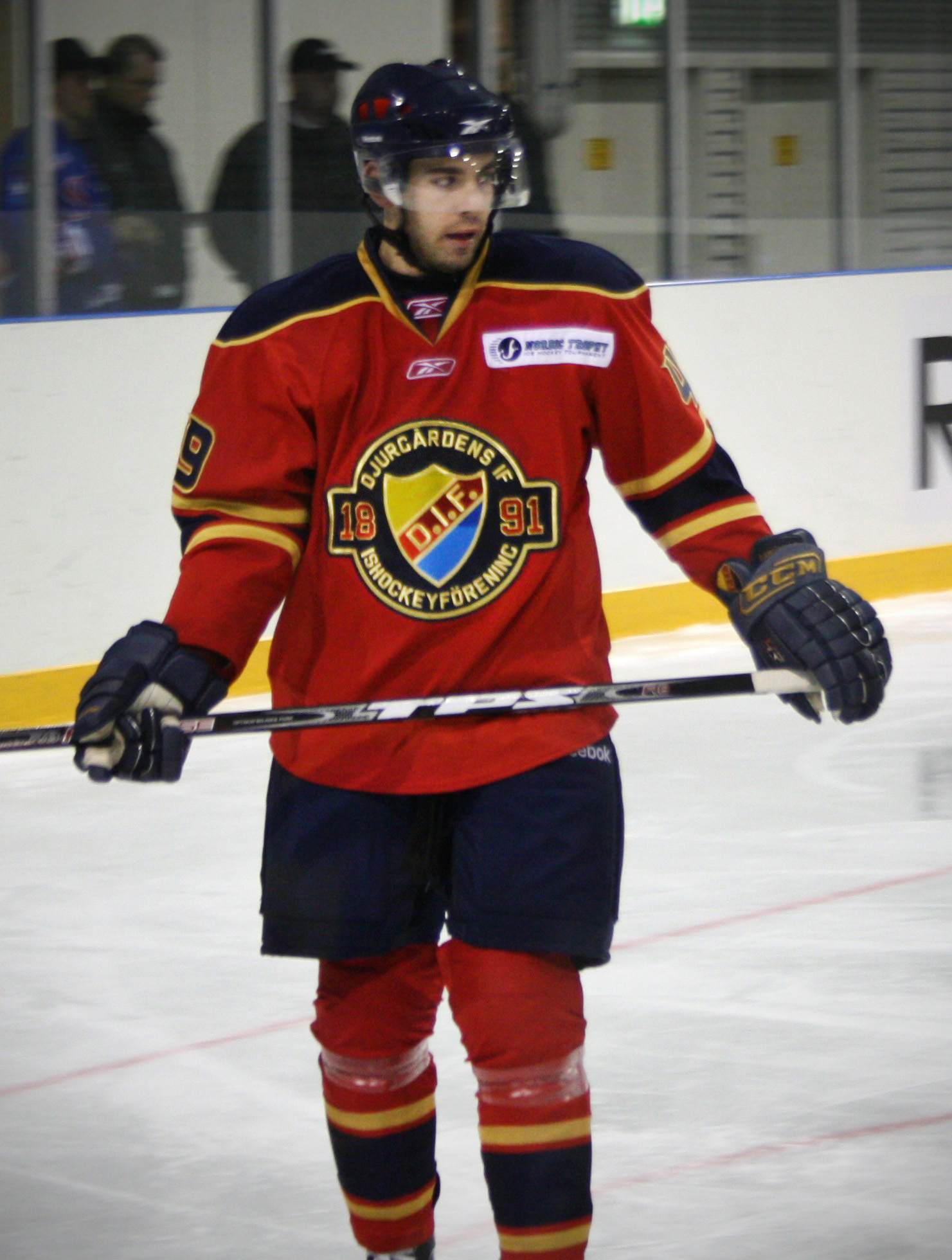
- Born: September 23, 1985 (age 40) Madison, Wisconsin, U.S.
- Height: 6 ft 0 in (183 cm)
- Weight: 181 lb (82 kg; 12 st 13 lb)
- Position: Defense
- Shot: Right
- Played for: Portland Pirates; TPS; Djurgårdens IF; Hamilton Bulldogs; IFK Helsinki; KHL Medveščak Zagreb; Nürnberg Ice Tigers; Krefeld Pinguine; EHC Black Wings Linz; Vienna Capitals
- NHL draft: 74th overall, 2004; Mighty Ducks of Anaheim
- Playing career: 2008–2018

Kyle Klubertanz (born September 23, 1985) is an American former professional ice hockey defenseman.

== Playing career ==
Klubertanz was selected by the Mighty Ducks of Anaheim in the 3rd round (74th overall) of the 2004 NHL entry draft. After graduating from his four-year collegiate career with the University of Wisconsin, Klubertanz made his professional debut on a try-out contract with the Ducks AHL affiliate, the Portland Pirates at the end of the 2007–08 season.

Unsigned from the Ducks, Klubertanz signed a one-year contract in the Finnish SM-liiga with TPS. The following season, he moved within Europe to the Swedish Elite League to play with Djurgårdens IF, establishing himself with 32 points, and he helped Djurgården to a silver medal finish.

On May 27, 2010, with NHL ambitions he signed a one-year contract with the Montreal Canadiens. Klubertanz was assigned to AHL affiliate, the Hamilton Bulldogs for the duration of the 2010–11 season.

Without an opportunity given with the Canadiens on June 1, 2011, Klubertanz signed a two-year contract to return to Sweden with Djurgården.

After a single season with KHL Medveščak Zagreb of the Kontinental Hockey League, Klubertanz opted to sign in Germany, agreeing to a two-year deal with the Nürnberg Ice Tigers of the Deutsche Eishockey Liga (DEL) on July 2, 2014. When his contract was up, he joined fellow DEL side Krefeld Pinguine, signing on July 1, 2016. In the following 2016–17 season, Klubertanz struggled to find his offensive game in Krefeld, collecting just 1 goal and 13 points in 47 games as the team languished at the bottom of the table. On February 15, 2017, Klubertanz was released from his contract in Krefeld and signed with neighbouring league, the EBEL, with EHC Black Wings Linz.

== Career statistics ==
=== Regular season and playoffs ===
			Regular season					Playoffs
Season	Team	League	GP	G	A	Pts	PIM	GP	G	A	Pts	PIM
2001–02	Chicago Chill 18U AAA	18U AAA
2002–03	Green Bay Gamblers	USHL	60	8	26	34	74	—	—	—	—	—
2003–04	Green Bay Gamblers	USHL	57	6	21	27	124	—	—	—	—	—
2004–05	University of Wisconsin	WCHA	41	3	15	18	64	—	—	—	—	—
2005–06	University of Wisconsin	WCHA	43	4	17	21	44	—	—	—	—	—
2006–07	University of Wisconsin	WCHA	34	1	12	13	46	—	—	—	—	—
2007–08	University of Wisconsin	WCHA	40	4	16	20	52	—	—	—	—	—
2007–08	Portland Pirates	AHL	5	0	0	0	2	1	0	0	0	0
2008–09	TPS	SM-liiga	51	5	7	12	62	8	3	0	3	20
2009–10	Djurgårdens IF	SEL	55	12	19	31	32	16	3	2	5	18
2010–11	Hamilton Bulldogs	AHL	76	10	22	32	46	20	0	10	10	22
2011–12	Djurgårdens IF	SEL	55	7	13	20	42	—	—	—	—	—
2012–13	HIFK	SM-liiga	41	5	20	25	30	7	1	2	3	8
2013–14	KHL Medveščak Zagreb	KHL	18	0	2	2	14	3	0	0	0	0
2014–15	Thomas Sabo Ice Tigers	DEL	52	11	19	30	38	8	1	3	4	2
2015–16	Thomas Sabo Ice Tigers	DEL	46	4	12	16	40	12	0	2	2	10
2016–17	Krefeld Pinguine	DEL	47	1	12	13	58	—	—	—	—	—
2016–17	EHC Liwest Black Wings Linz	AUT	3	0	0	0	2	5	0	2	2	2
2017–18	Vienna Capitals	AUT	52	3	21	24	39	11	1	2	3	22
SEL totals			110	19	32	51	74	16	3	2	5	18
DEL totals			145	16	43	59	136	20	1	5	6	12

=== International ===
Year	Team	Event	GP	G	A	Pts	PIM
2003	United States	WJC18	6	0	0	0	4
Junior totals			6	0	0	0	4

== Awards and honors ==
Award	Year
College
All-WCHA Rookie Team	2005
WCHA All-Tournament Team	2006
