= Florian Conz =

Swiss ice hockey player

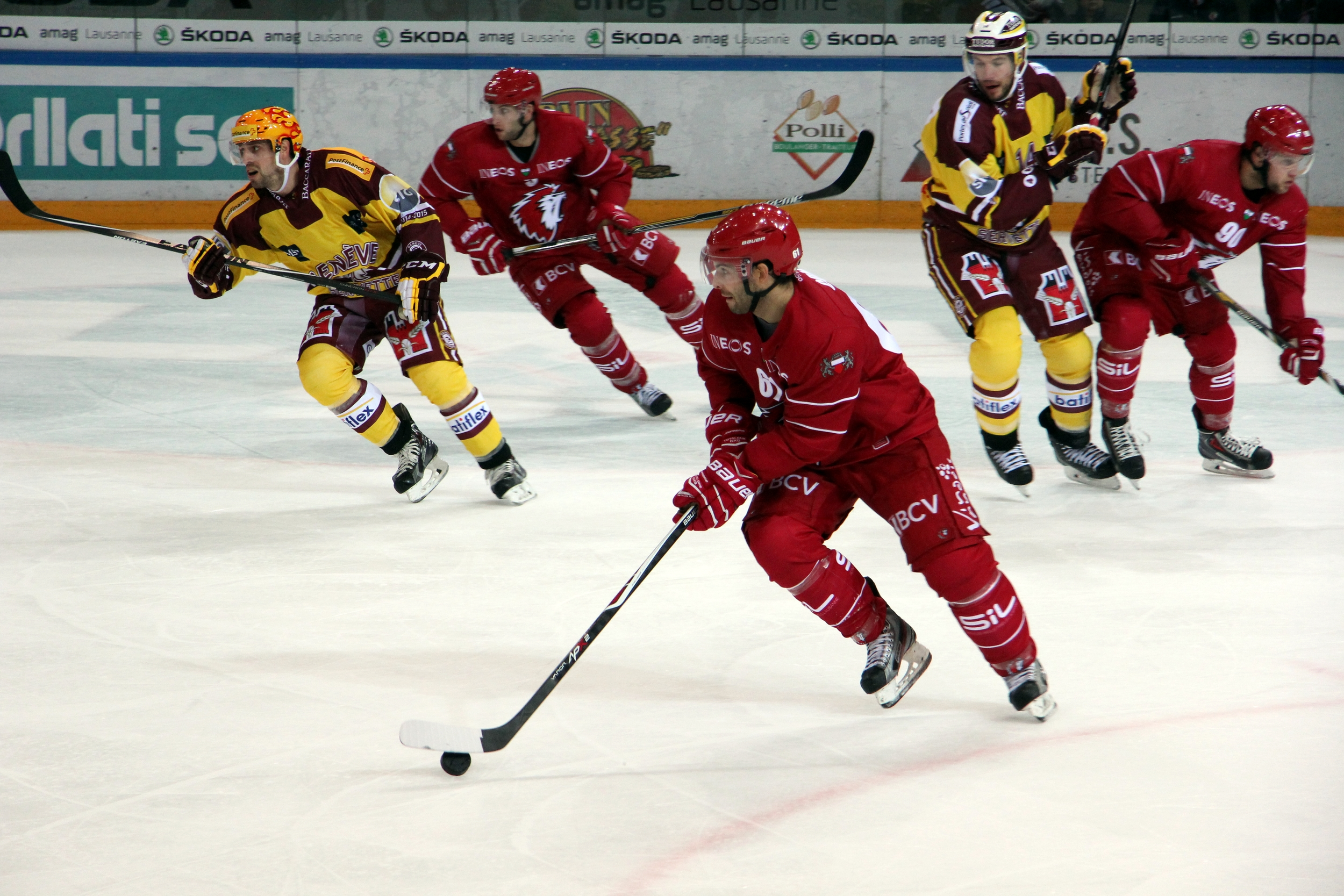
- Florian Conz (L 61, player in the middle) mid-game
- Born: 20 October 1984 (age 40); Switzerland
- Height: 5 ft 8 in (173 cm)
- Weight: 176 lb (80 kg; 12 st 8 lb)
- Position: Centre
- Shoots: Left
- NLA team Former teams: Lausanne HC; Genève-Servette HC
- NHL draft: Undrafted
- Playing career: 2001–present

Florian Conz (born 20 October 1984) is a Swiss ice hockey player. He is currently playing with Lausanne HC of the Swiss National League A.

Conz made his National League A debut playing with Lausanne HC during the 2003–04 NLA season.
