= Petr Domin =

Czech ice hockey forward

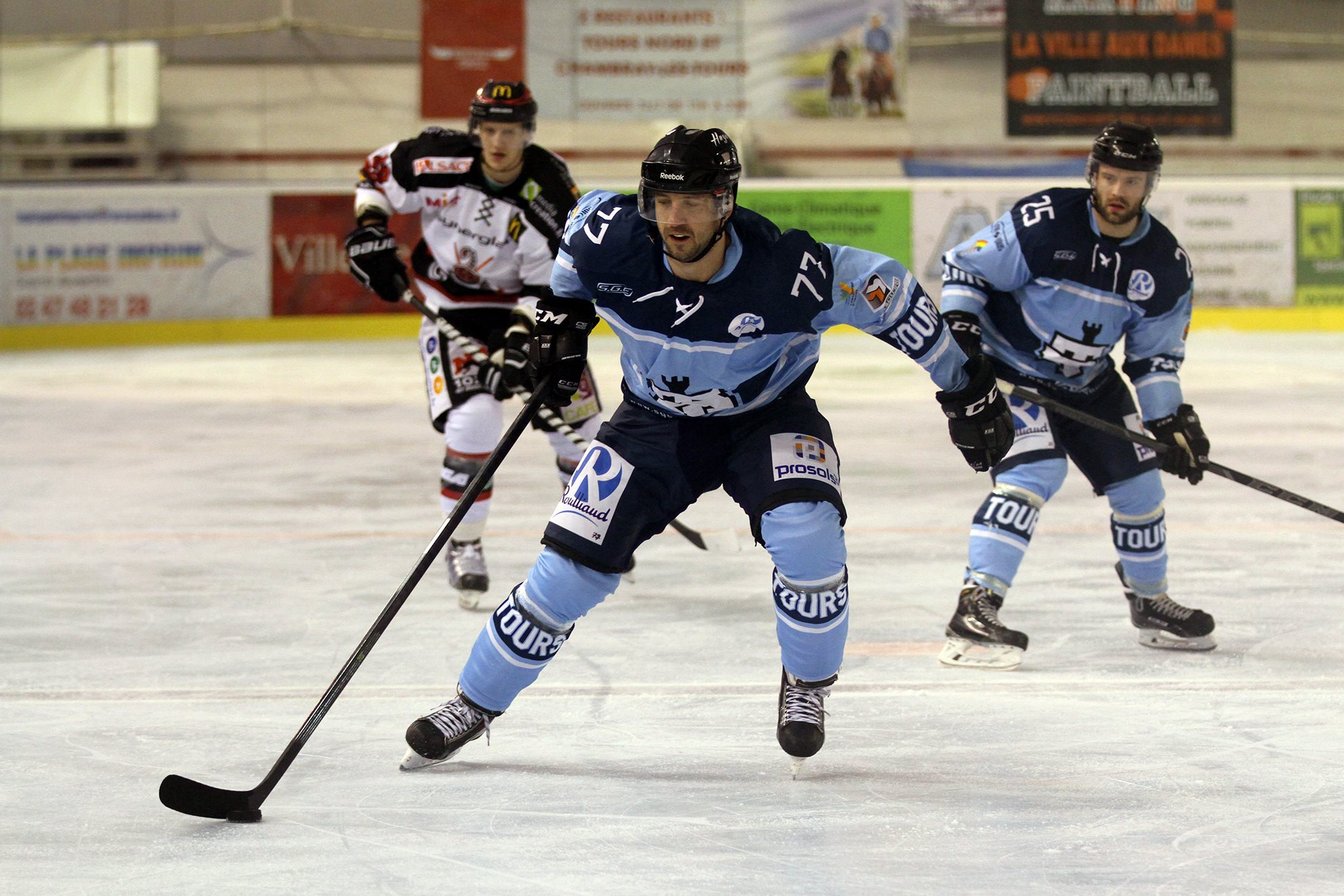
- Petr Domin
- Born: January 2, 1983 (age 43)
- Height: 6 ft 3 in (191 cm)
- Weight: 207 lb (94 kg; 14 st 11 lb)
- Position: Forward
- Shot: Left
- Played for: HC Karlovy Vary
- Playing career: 1999–2016

Petr Domin (born January 2, 1983) is a Czech former professional ice hockey forward.

Domin made his Czech Extraliga debut during the 1999–00 season with HC Karlovy Vary and played 32 regular season games for the team over the next five seasons, scoring two goals and three assists.

Domin played in the 2003 World Junior Ice Hockey Championships for the Czech Republic.
