= Martin Walter =

Czech-born German ice hockey player

- Born: October 23, 1983 (age 41); Ostrava, Czechoslovakia
- Height: 5 ft 11 in (180 cm)
- Weight: 176 lb (80 kg; 12 st 8 lb)
- Position: Defence
- Shoots: Right
- team Former teams: Free Agent; Hamburg Freezers; Grizzly Adams Wolfsburg; Thomas Sabo Ice Tigers
- NHL draft: Undrafted
- Playing career: 2002–present

Martin Walter (born October 23, 1983) is a, Czech-born German professional ice hockey defenceman. He is currently an Unrestricted Free Agent. He most recently played for Grizzly Adams Wolfsburg in the Deutsche Eishockey Liga (DEL).
