= Lukáš Chmelíř =

Czech ice hockey player

- Born: April 15, 1983 (age 43) Ostrava, Czechoslovakia
- Height: 5 ft 11 in (180 cm)
- Weight: 190 lb (86 kg; 13 st 8 lb)
- Position: Defence
- Shot: Left
- Czech Extraliga team: HC Sparta Praha
- Playing career: 2000–2018

Lukáš Chmelíř (born April 15, 1983, in Ostrava) is a Czech professional ice hockey player. He played with HC Sparta Praha in the Czech Extraliga during the 2010–11 Czech Extraliga postseason.

== Career statistics ==
			Regular season					Playoffs
Season	Team	League	GP	G	A	Pts	PIM	GP	G	A	Pts	PIM
1998–99	HC Vitkovice U18	Czech U18	46	5	14	19	—	—	—	—	—	—
1999–00	HC Vitkovice U18	Czech U18	23	6	13	19	40	3	0	3	3	4
1999–00	HC Vitkovice U20	Czech U20	16	1	1	2	22	—	—	—	—	—
2000–01	HC Karlovy Vary U20	Czech U20	33	7	8	15	62	—	—	—	—	—
2000–01	HC Karlovy Vary	Czech	4	0	0	0	0	—	—	—	—	—
2001–02	HC Vitkovice U20	Czech U20	31	8	17	25	114	2	0	0	0	0
2001–02	HC Vitkovice	Czech	18	0	0	0	8	10	1	0	1	4
2001–02	HC Slezan Opava	Czech2	9	2	0	2	10	4	2	0	2	0
2002–03	HC Vitkovice U20	Czech U20	8	1	8	9	12	—	—	—	—	—
2002–03	HC Vitkovice	Czech	33	1	5	6	18	3	0	0	0	0
2002–03	HC Slezan Opava	Czech2	1	0	0	0	2	—	—	—	—	—
2002–03	HC Dukla Jihlava	Czech2	5	2	1	3	4	4	0	0	0	0
2003–04	HC Vitkovice U20	Czech U20	8	4	4	8	18	—	—	—	—	—
2003–04	HC Vitkovice	Czech	34	2	2	4	16	2	0	0	0	0
2003–04	HC Havířov Panthers	Czech2	20	0	2	2	16	—	—	—	—	—
2004–05	HC Dukla Jihlava	Czech	2	0	0	0	0	—	—	—	—	—
2004–05	HC Vitkovice	Czech	13	0	4	4	10	—	—	—	—	—
2004–05	HC Ostrava	Czech	30	3	6	9	28	3	0	0	0	6
2005–06	HC Vitkovice	Czech	9	0	1	1	4	—	—	—	—	—
2005–06	Vsetínská hokejová	Czech	11	0	1	1	2	—	—	—	—	—
2005–06	HC Oceláři Třinec	Czech	23	1	3	4	26	4	0	1	1	6
2006–07	HC Vitkovice	Czech	25	0	1	1	16	—	—	—	—	—
2006–07	HC Havířov Panthers	Czech2	8	1	0	1	0	—	—	—	—	—
2007–08	HC Olomouc	Czech2	12	0	2	2	6	11	2	2	4	2
2007–08	HC Znojemští Orli	Czech	5	1	0	1	0	—	—	—	—	—
2008–09	SK Kadaň	Czech2	14	4	4	8	14	—	—	—	—	—
2008–09	KLH Chomutov	Czech2	32	0	0	0	12	—	—	—	—	—
2009–10	HC Vrchlabí	Czech2	45	5	11	16	36	5	1	1	2	4
2010–11	HC Hradec Králové	Czech2	44	5	13	18	42	9	0	2	2	6
2011–12	HC Hradec Králové	Czech2	46	0	5	5	26	6	0	0	0	2
2012–13	Královští lvi Hradec Králové	Czech2	35	1	11	12	34	6	0	1	1	8
2013–14	HC Motor České Budějovice	Czech2	50	5	5	10	43	—	—	—	—	—
2014–15	HC Motor České Budějovice	Czech2	52	1	7	8	36	—	—	—	—	—
2015–16	HC Přerov	Czech2	48	1	23	24	71	3	0	2	2	4
2016–17	HC Přerov	Czech2	52	2	20	22	58	8	0	2	2	8
2017–18	HC Přerov	Czech2	44	0	12	12	30	4	0	1	1	0
Czech totals			177	5	17	22	100	19	1	1	2	10
Czech2 totals			547	32	122	154	468	63	4	11	15	40
