= Andrée Brendheden =

Swedish ice hockey player

- Born: 12 January 1983 (age 43) Finja, SWE
- Height: 6 ft 4 in (193 cm)
- Weight: 216 lb (98 kg; 15 st 6 lb)
- Position: Right wing
- Shot: Right
- Played for: Tyringe SoSS; Växjö Lakers; Södertälje SK; Rögle BK; Karlskrona HK
- Playing career: 2003–2013

Andrée Brendheden (born Andrée Persson; 12 January 1983) is a Swedish professional ice hockey forward who currently plays for Rögle BK in the Swedish Elitserien.

== Career statistics ==
			Regular season					Playoffs
Season	Team	League	GP	G	A	Pts	PIM	GP	G	A	Pts	PIM
2001–02	Tyringe SoSS J20	J20 Elit	—	—	—	—	—	—	—	—	—	—
2001–02	Tyringe SoSS	Division 1	—	9	9	18	—	—	—	—	—	—
2002–03	Tyringe SoSS	Division 1	—	10	9	19	—	—	—	—	—	—
2003–04	Växjö Lakers HC	Allsvenskan	41	3	2	5	16	5	1	0	1	6
2004–05	Växjö Lakers HC	Allsvenskan	38	4	2	6	39	2	0	0	0	0
2004–05	Växjö Lakers HC J20	J20 Elit	—	—	—	—	—	—	—	—	—	—
2005–06	Växjö Lakers HC	HockeyAllsvenskan	42	20	13	33	32	—	—	—	—	—
2006–07	Södertälje SK	HockeyAllsvenskan	40	6	8	14	16	10	0	1	1	0
2007–08	Rögle BK	HockeyAllsvenskan	39	21	12	33	70	10	7	4	11	4
2008–09	Rögle BK	Elitserien	55	15	13	28	80	—	—	—	—	—
2009–10	Rögle BK	Elitserien	34	4	7	11	16	—	—	—	—	—
2010–11	Rögle BK	HockeyAllsvenskan	47	10	6	16	18	7	1	0	1	0
2011–12	Rögle BK	HockeyAllsvenskan	20	7	6	13	0	10	2	2	4	0
2012–13	Rögle BK	Elitserien	16	1	2	3	0	—	—	—	—	—
2012–13	Karlskrona HK	HockeyAllsvenskan	7	1	0	1	4	—	—	—	—	—
Elitserien totals			105	20	22	42	96	—	—	—	—	—
HockeyAllsvenskan totals			195	65	45	110	140	37	10	7	17	4
