= Stephan Wilhelm =

German ice hockey player

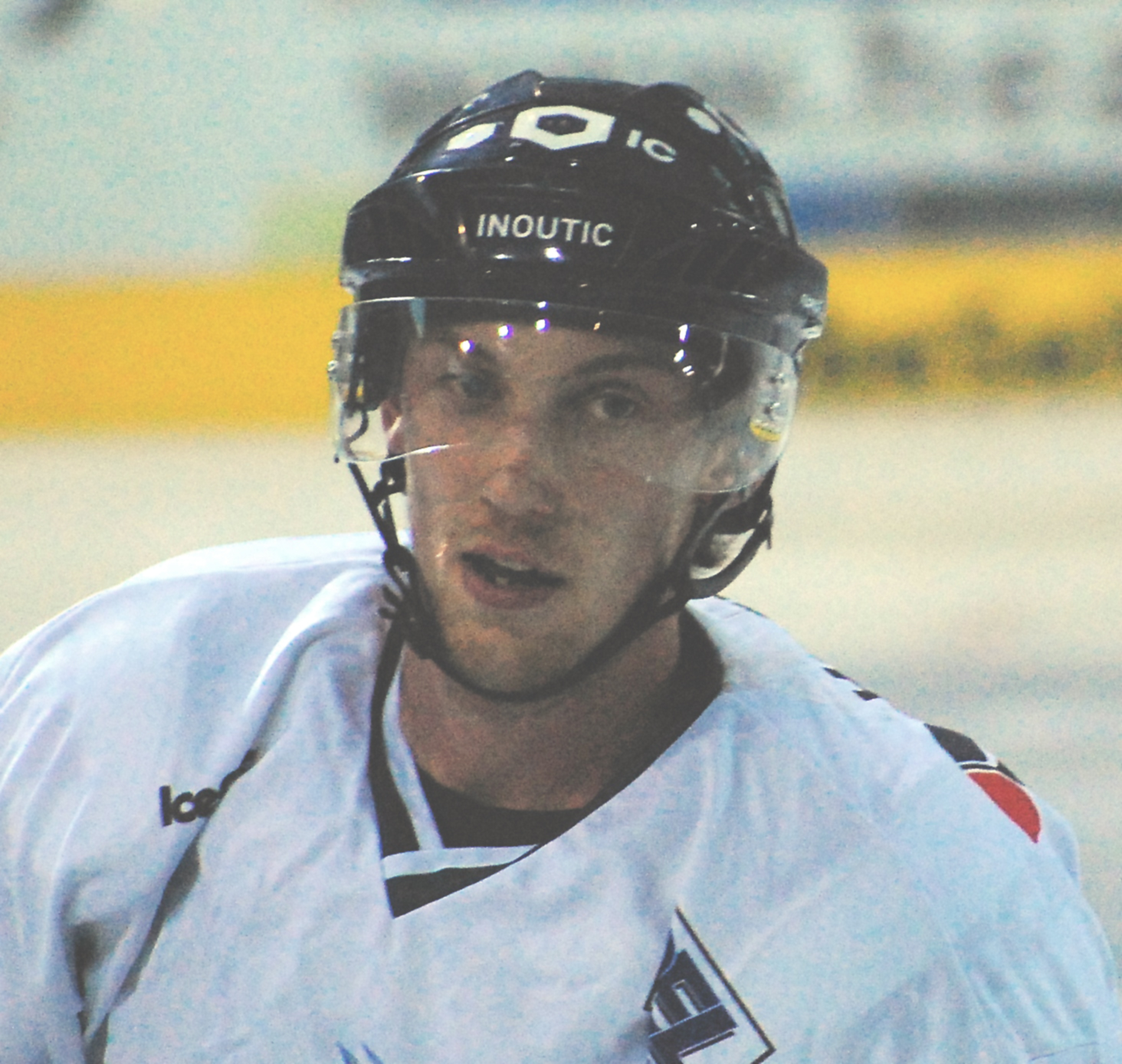
- Born: July 12, 1983 (age 41); Garmisch-Partenkirchen, West Germany
- Height: 6 ft 2 in (188 cm)
- Weight: 198 lb (90 kg; 14 st 2 lb)
- Position: Defence
- Shoots: Left
- DEL2 team Former teams: SC Riessersee; Straubing Tigers; Hannover Scorpions; Schwenninger Wild Wings
- NHL draft: Undrafted
- Playing career: 2001–present

Stephan Wilhelm (born July 12, 1983) is a German professional ice hockey defenceman. He is currently playing for the SC Riessersee in the DEL2. He has previously played for the Hannover Scorpions, the Straubing Tigers, and the Schwenninger Wild Wings. On July 5, 2013, Wilhelm signed a one-year contract to transfer from the Scorpions to the Wild Wings.
