= Juraj Sýkora =

Slovak ice hockey player

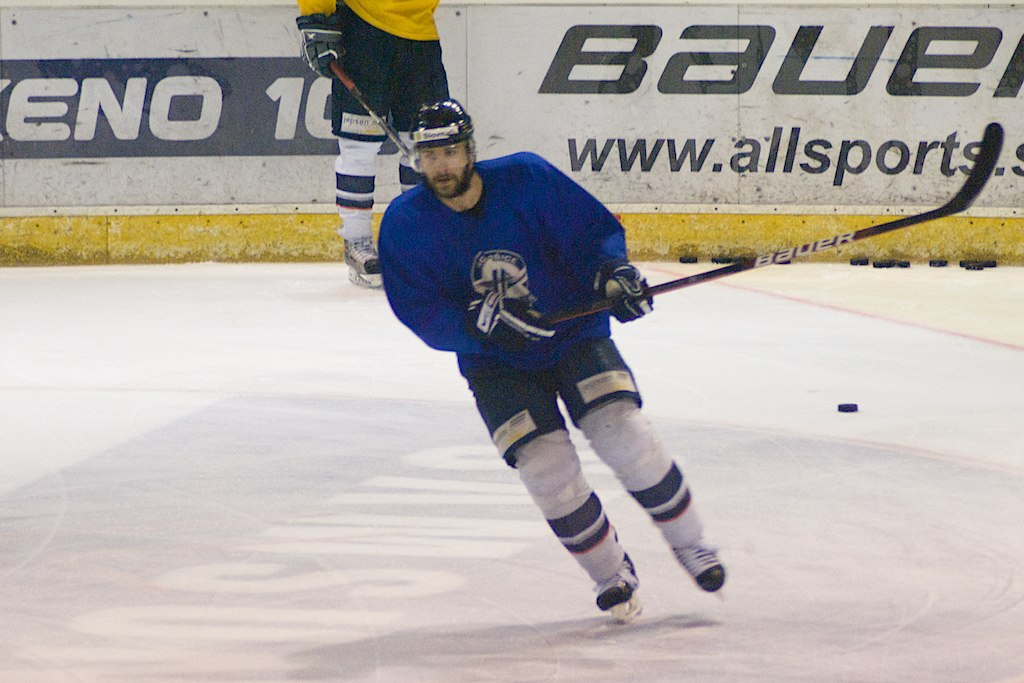
- Born: 19 September 1983 (age 41); Bratislava, Czechoslovakia
- Height: 6 ft 3 in (191 cm)
- Position: Centre
- Slovak Extraliga team: HC Slovan Bratislava
- Playing career: 1998–present

Juraj Sýkora (born 19 September 1983) is a Slovak professional ice hockey player who played with HC Slovan Bratislava in the Slovak Extraliga.
