= Milan Varga =

Slovak ice hockey defenceman

- Born: August 1, 1983 (age 42) Košice, Czechoslovakia
- Height: 5 ft 10 in (178 cm)
- Weight: 183 lb (83 kg; 13 st 1 lb)
- Position: Defence
- Shot: Left
- Played for: HC Košice; HK Poprad; MHk 32 Liptovský Mikuláš; Dunaújvárosi Acélbikák; CSM Corona Brașov; MsHK Žilina; Aigles de Nice
- Playing career: 2001–2019

Milan Varga (born August 1, 1983) is a Slovak former ice hockey defenceman.

== Career ==
Varga played in the Tipsport Liga for HC Košice, HK Poprad, MHk 32 Liptovský Mikuláš and MsHK Žilina, playing a total of 301 games in nine seasons. He also played in the MOL Liga for Dunaújvárosi Acélbikák and CSM Corona Brașov as well as spending four seasons with Aigles de Nice in France. He played three seasons in the FFHG Division 1 and one in Ligue Magnus before leaving the team on January 28, 2017.

Varga played in the 2003 IIHF World U20 Championship for Slovakia, playing six games and scoring one goal.
