= Caryl Neuenschwander =

Swiss ice hockey player

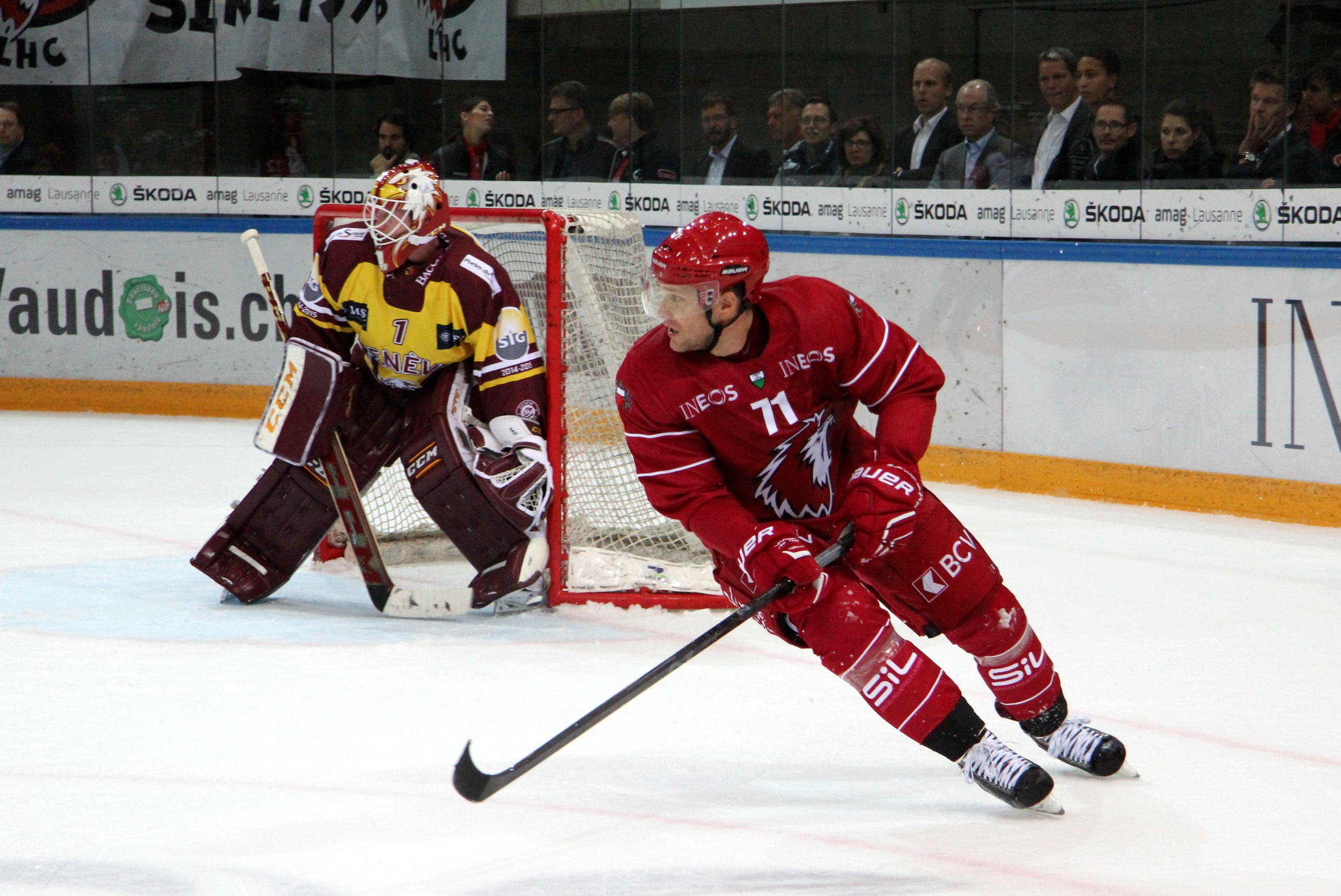
- Born: January 16, 1984 (age 41); Landeyeux, Switzerland
- Height: 5 ft 11 in (180 cm)
- Weight: 203 lb (92 kg; 14 st 7 lb)
- Position: Right wing
- Shoots: Right
- NLA team: Lausanne Hockey Club
- National team: Switzerland
- NHL draft: Undrafted
- Playing career: 2001–present

Caryl Neuenschwander (born January 16, 1984) is a Swiss professional ice hockey player. He is currently playing for the Lausanne Hockey Club of Switzerland's National League A.
