= Andy Carroll (Australian footballer) =

Australian rules footballer, born 1906

Personal information
- Full name: Andrew William George Carroll
- Born: 19 July 1906; Geelong, Victoria
- Died: 30 December 1970 (aged 64); Newtown, Victoria

Playing career^{1}
Years	Club	Games (Goals)
1928–1929	Geelong	10 (3)
- ^{1} Playing statistics correct to the end of 1929.

Andrew William George Carroll (19 July 1906 – 30 December 1970) was an Australian rules footballer who played for the Geelong Football Club in the Victorian Football League (VFL).

The son of Ada Jane Collins, Andrew William George Collins was born in Geelong on 19 July 1906. He later took the surname Carroll when his mother married William Henry Carroll.
