= Roman Vondráček =

Czech ice hockey forward

- Born: September 26, 1984 (age 41) Trutnov, Czechoslovakia
- Height: 5 ft 8 in (173 cm)
- Weight: 181 lb (82 kg; 12 st 13 lb)
- Position: Forward
- Shoots: Right
- Ligue Magnus team Former teams: Rapaces de Gap; HC Sparta Praha; HC Plzeň; HC Kometa Brno; Brest Albatros Hockey; Aigles de Nice
- Playing career: 2002–present

Roman Vondráček (born September 26, 1984) is a Czech professional ice hockey forward currently playing for Rapaces de Gap of the Ligue Magnus.

Vondrácek played in the Czech Extraliga for HC Sparta Praha, HC Plzeň and HC Kometa Brno. On November 8, 2013, he joined Rapaces de Gap of the Ligue Magnus. On May 10, 2015, he joined Brest Albatros Hockey where he played for one season before moving to Aigles de Nice on June 17, 2016. On December 15, 2018, Vondráček rejoined Rapaces de Gap.
