= Andrew Carroll (ice hockey) =

American ice hockey player (1985–2018)

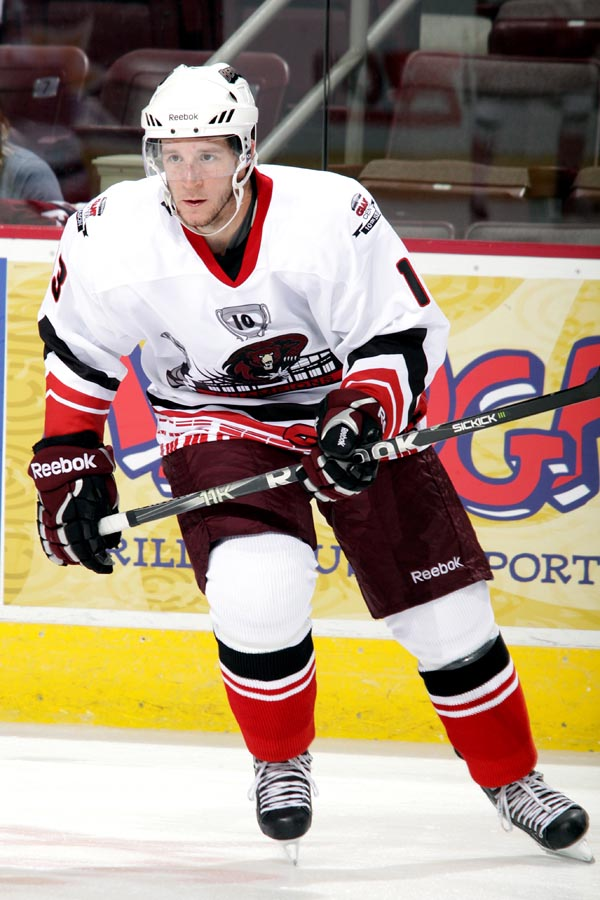
- Carroll with the Hershey Bears in 2011
- Born: May 7, 1985 Shoreview, Minnesota, U.S.
- Died: January 22, 2018 (aged 32) Chicago, Illinois, U.S.
- Height: 5 ft 11 in (180 cm)
- Weight: 194 lb (88 kg; 13 st 12 lb)
- Position: Left wing
- Shot: Left
- Played for: Hartford Wolf Pack; Abbotsford Heat; Peoria Rivermen; Hershey Bears
- NHL draft: Undrafted
- Playing career: 2009–2016

Andrew Thomas Carroll (May 7, 1985 – January 22, 2018) was an American professional ice hockey player who most notably played in the American Hockey League (AHL).

== Playing career ==
Before turning professional, while going undrafted Carroll attended the University of Minnesota Duluth where he played four seasons of college hockey with the NCAA Division I Minnesota–Duluth Bulldogs men's ice hockey team.

On July 18, 2013, Carroll returned to his original AHL club, signing a one-year contract with the Hartford Wolf Pack.

After a one-year hiatus, Carroll returned to professional hockey by signing a one-year ECHL contract with his former club, the Idaho Steelheads, on August 27, 2015.

== Death ==
Chicago police responded to the outside lanes of Terminal 2 in Chicago's O'Hare Airport at 4:30 a.m. on Sunday, January 21, after receiving a call of a “person down”. It was reported Carroll had "trauma to his head." Camera recordings revealed that it appeared that Carroll had "jumped from the upper level roadway to the lower level roadway on his own accord." He was initially taken to Resurrection Hospital in critical condition.

On January 22, 2018, the University of Minnesota Duluth released a statement that Carroll had died at the age of 32. The Carroll family revealed in their statement that Carroll died as a result of a fall at Chicago's O'Hare Airport on January 22, 2018. The University of Minnesota Duluth men's hockey team announced that they would wear special "AC" commemorative stickers on their helmets for the remainder of the 2017–18 season. The medical examiner's office ruled the death a suicide. In April 2019, Carroll was later diagnosed with chronic traumatic encephalopathy by Boston University researchers.
