= Justin Fletcher (ice hockey) =

American ice hockey player (born 1983)

- Born: March 30, 1983 (age 43) Maryville, Illinois, U.S.
- Height: 5 ft 11 in (180 cm)
- Weight: 190 lb (86 kg; 13 st 8 lb)
- Position: Defence
- Shot: Left
- Played for: Springfield Falcons; Norfolk Admirals; Rockford IceHogs; Peoria Rivermen; Augsburger Panther; Tohoku Free Blades; Vienna Capitals
- Playing career: 2007–2014

Justin Fletcher (born 30 March 1983) is a former American professional ice hockey defenceman who last played for the Vienna Capitals of the Austrian Hockey League.

== Career ==
Fletcher previously played with Tohoku Free Blades in the Asia League Ice Hockey and the Augsburger Panther in the DEL. He has also played 179 regular-season games in the American Hockey League for the Springfield Falcons, Norfolk Admirals, Rockford IceHogs, and Peoria Rivermen. While with the Rivermen, Fletcher was signed to an NHL contract with affiliate, the St. Louis Blues.

== Career statistics ==
			Regular season					Playoffs
Season	Team	League	GP	G	A	Pts	PIM	GP	G	A	Pts	PIM
2000–01	Sioux City Musketeers	USHL	38	0	5	5	28	3	0	0	0	0
2001–02	Sioux City Musketeers	USHL	56	3	10	13	48	12	2	1	3	6
2002–03	Sioux City Musketeers	USHL	60	12	31	43	28	4	0	3	3	6
2003–04	St. Cloud State	WCHA	29	6	7	13	22	—	—	—	—	—
2004–05	St. Cloud State	WCHA	36	8	14	22	86	—	—	—	—	—
2005–06	St. Cloud State	WCHA	40	6	21	27	55	—	—	—	—	—
2006–07	St. Cloud State	WCHA	38	6	18	24	37	—	—	—	—	—
2006–07	Springfield Falcons	AHL	10	3	1	4	4	—	—	—	—	—
2007–08	Norfolk Admirals	AHL	39	1	4	5	37	—	—	—	—	—
2007–08	Rockford IceHogs	AHL	20	4	7	11	43	11	0	1	1	6
2008–09	Peoria Rivermen	AHL	68	8	24	32	50	7	0	2	2	6
2009–10	Peoria Rivermen	AHL	42	3	14	17	19	—	—	—	—	—
2010–11	Augsburger Panther	DEL	50	5	24	29	24	—	—	—	—	—
2011–12	Augsburger Panther	DEL	41	2	16	18	30	2	0	0	0	0
2012–13	Tohoku Free Blades	Asia League	41	11	23	34	56	8	2	4	6	12
2013–14	Vienna Capitals	EBEL	25	1	3	4	8	—	—	—	—	—
AHL totals			179	19	50	69	153	18	0	3	3	12
