= Brett Sterling =

American ice hockey player

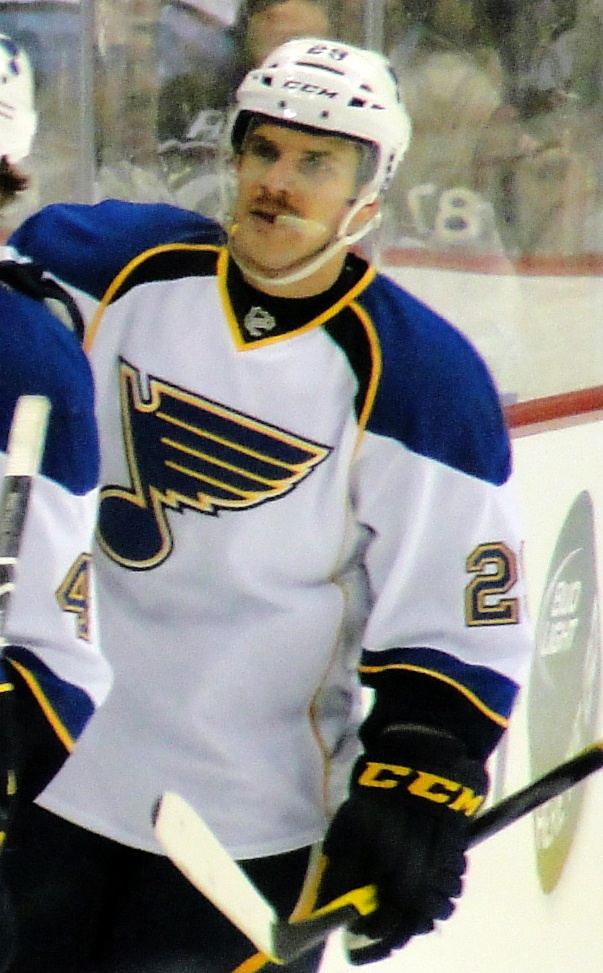
- Sterling with the St. Louis Blues in 2011
- Born: April 24, 1984 (age 42) Los Angeles, California, U.S.
- Height: 5 ft 7 in (170 cm)
- Weight: 175 lb (79 kg; 12 st 7 lb)
- Position: Left wing
- Shot: Left
- Played for: Atlanta Thrashers; Pittsburgh Penguins; St. Louis Blues; HV71; Örebro HK; EC Red Bull Salzburg
- NHL draft: 145th overall, 2003; Atlanta Thrashers
- Playing career: 2006–2018

Brett Stewart Sterling (born April 24, 1984) is an American former professional ice hockey left winger who played in the National Hockey League (NHL) with the Atlanta Thrashers, the Pittsburgh Penguins, and the St. Louis Blues.

Sterling was selected by the Thrashers in the 5th round (145th overall) of the 2003 NHL entry draft. In his first professional season he won the Willie Marshall Award as the American Hockey League's leading goal scorer, and the Dudley "Red" Garrett Memorial Award as rookie of the year. In addition, he was named to the All-Rookie Team and an AHL First All-Star Team.

== Early life ==
Sterling, who is Jewish, was born in Los Angeles, California. He grew up in Pasadena, California, having been introduced to the sport by an uncle who bought Sterling his first pair of skates at age two. He played in the 1998 Quebec International Pee-Wee Hockey Tournament with the Los Angeles Junior Kings minor ice hockey team. His GPA in high school was 4.2.

== Playing career ==
Sterling's four-year college career was spent with Colorado College, where he played with future Atlanta Thrashers teammate Colin Stuart. He accumulated 108 goals and 184 points in 150 games played over his college career and was drafted in the fifth round, 145th overall, by the Atlanta Thrashers in the 2003 NHL entry draft. Sterling scored 28 points in 30 games as a sophomore for Colorado College. He finished third in scoring for the Tigers, missing the first part of the season due to an injury. Sterling's best collegiate season came in 2004–05, when he had 34 goals, 29 assists and 63 points. That year, he was a top 3 finalist for the Hobey Baker Award, given annually to college hockey's top player. The following year, in his senior season, he was a top 10 finalist.

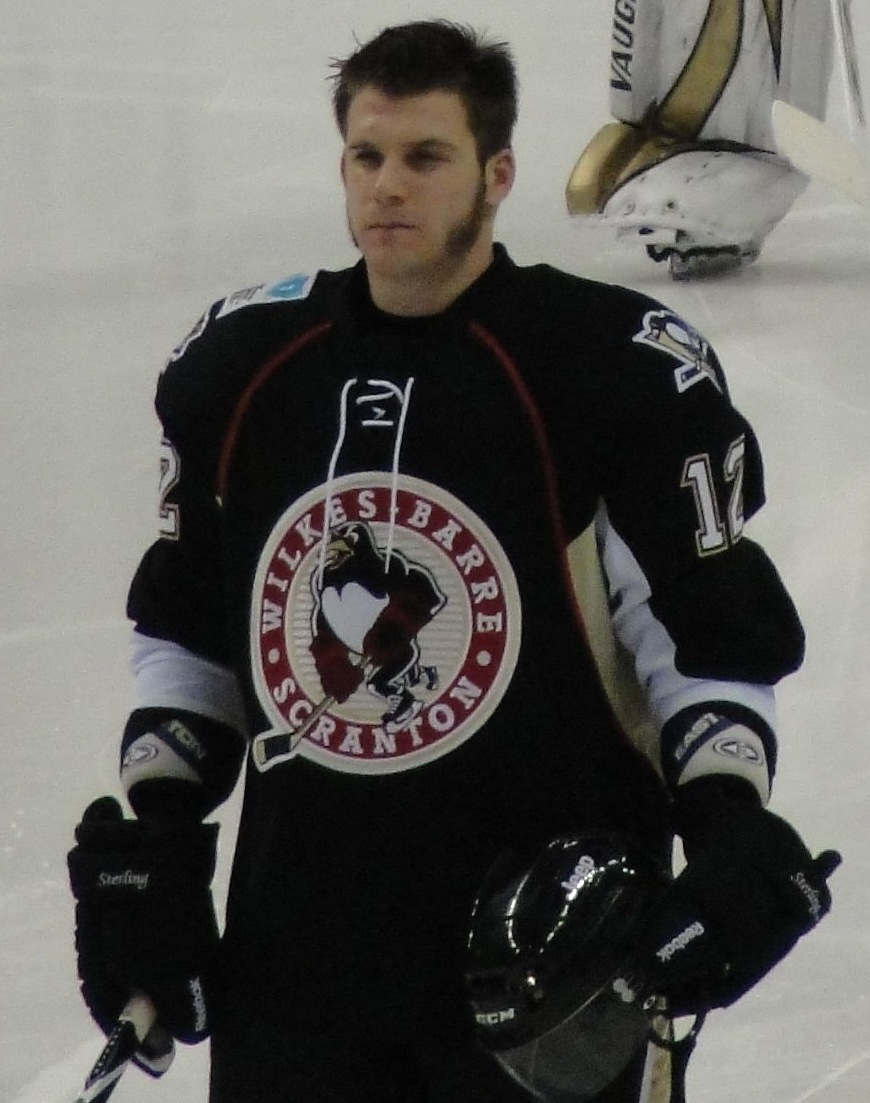
Sterling with the Baby Penguins in 2010.

Sterling garnered many accolades in his first season of pro hockey. Playing with the Chicago Wolves, the Thrashers' American Hockey League affiliate, he amassed 55 goals and 97 points in 77 games. He also added 12 points in 15 playoff games. He won the Willie Marshall Award as the league's leading goal scorer, and also won the Dudley "Red" Garret Memorial Trophy as rookie of the year. In addition, he was also named to the All-Rookie Team and AHL First All-Star Team.

=== American Hockey League ===
With his stellar play in his only season in the AHL, Sterling made the Atlanta Thrashers roster out of training camp for the 2007–08 NHL season. He would score his first NHL goal against Johan Holmqvist on October 20, 2007. However, he was unable to maintain a high level of play on the struggling Thrashers and was sent back to Chicago shortly into the season. He would be called up several times during the year.

During the 2008–09 season, Sterling's goal production dropped by 21 from 38 the previous season to only 17, his lowest total since 2003–04 when he was with Colorado College. He rebounded in 2009–10 to score 34 goals for Chicago in 55 games, tying with Ryan Keller of the Binghamton Senators for 6th in the league, however he would not play in any NHL games for the first time since his rookie season with the Wolves.

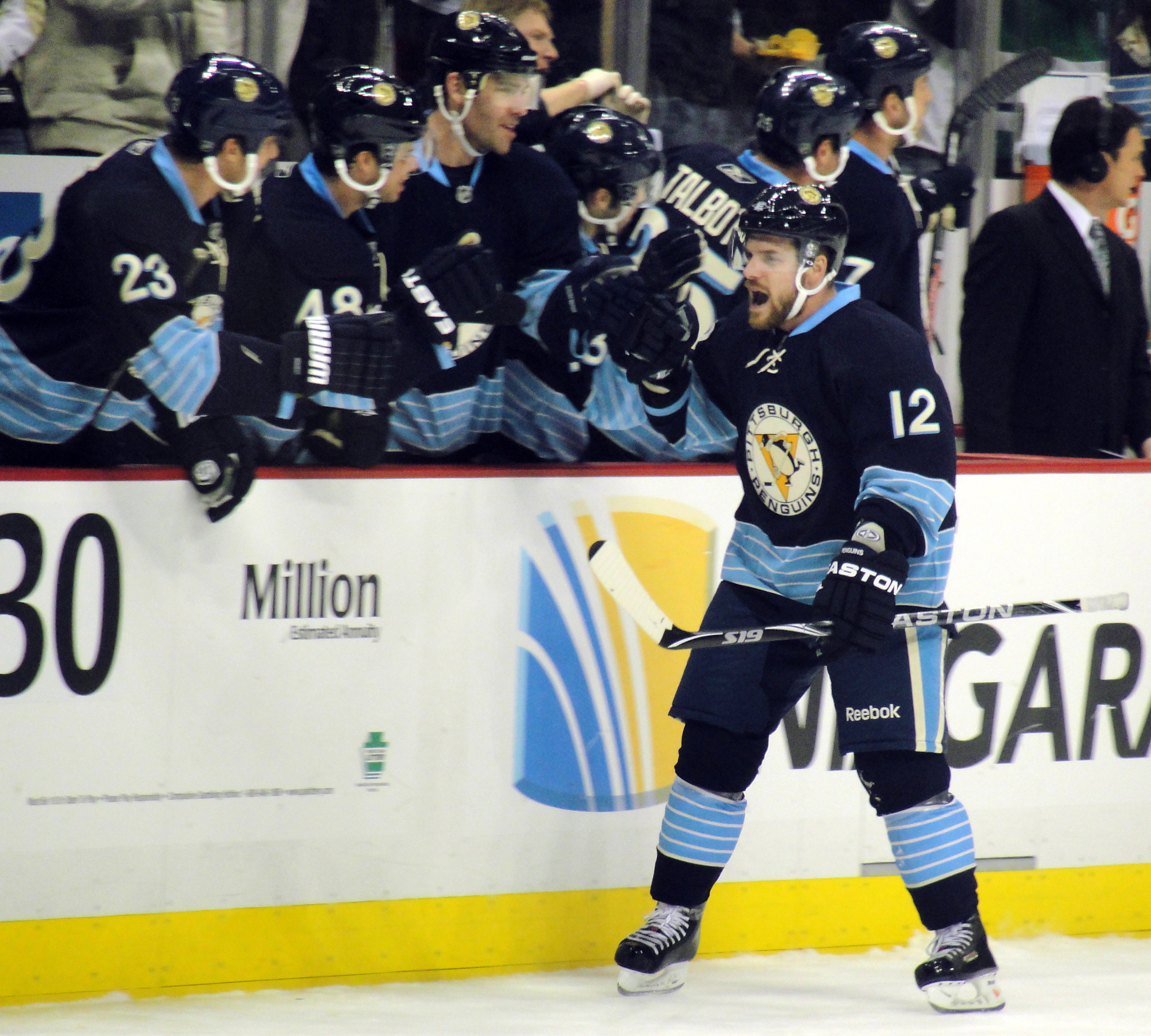
Brett Sterling's 1st goal as a Penguin in his debut with the team.

On June 23, 2010, Sterling was traded by the Thrashers, along with Mike Vernace and a 7th round selection in 2010 NHL entry draft (Lee Moffie), to the San Jose Sharks for future considerations in order to help the Thrashers facilitate an earlier trade of Dustin Byfuglien from the Chicago Blackhawks. However, with his contract set to expire the Sharks chose not to re-sign Sterling.

=== Pittsburgh Penguins ===
On July 3, 2010, Sterling was signed by the Pittsburgh Penguins to a 1-year contract, worth $500,000. Despite his new surroundings, Sterling was unable to make the Penguins' roster coming out of training camp and was placed on waivers. After spending most of the year in the AHL Sterling was called up to the NHL on February 10, 2011, he made his Penguins debut later in the day in a game against the Los Angeles Kings. He scored his first goal as a Penguin in the game. After playing 7 games for the Penguins, registering 3 goals and 5 points he was re-assened to the Wilkes-Barre/Scranton Penguins. He finished the year with 27 goals and 53 points in 65 games for the Baby Penguins.

=== St. Louis Blues ===
In the off season Sterling signed a one-year two-way contract with the St. Louis Blues. He began the year with St. Louis farm team the Peoria Rivermen. After 18 games Sterling was tied for the league lead in goals, 12, second in points with 22 and was called up by the Blues. He proceeded to make his Blues debut against his former team, Pittsburgh. In all he played four games with the Blues without registering a point. Sterling returned to Peoria and after playing 54 games and leading the team with 22 goals, he was traded (though his rights were retained by St. Louis) to the Portland Pirates for Patrick O'Sullivan. Sterling was the Rivermen's leading goal scorer at the time. He finished the year scoring 8 goals and 14 points with Portland as the Pirates failed to make the playoffs.

=== Return to AHL ===
On the move again in the off-season, Sterling returned to the site of his most AHL success signing an AHL contract with the Wolves. He was reunited with Darren Haydar, who played on a line with Sterling when he won the AHL goal scoring title.

=== Swedish Hockey League ===
For season 2013–14, Sterling signed a one-year contract with HV71 in the Swedish Hockey League. Sterling failed to establish his career offensive output totalling just 11 goals and 20 points in 43 games, before finishing the season on loan with SHL competitor Örebro HK.

=== Austrian Hockey League ===
On June 25, 2014, Sterling changed European leagues, in opting to join Austrian club, EC Red Bull Salzburg of the EBEL on a one-year contract.

Sterling dominated the action on the ice for Salzburg, helping them to a league championship in 2015. He remained with Salzburg in the 2015–16 season, and again helped them to a league championship.

=== Return to AHL ===
As a free agent in the following summer, Sterling opted to return to familiar grounds, signing a one-year AHL deal with the Chicago Wolves on July 22, 2016. After continuing through to the 2017–18 season with the Wolves, Sterling registered 25 points in 45 games before opting to end his professional career after 12 years.

== International ==
Medal record

Representing United States

Ice hockey

World Junior Championships
Gold medal – first place	2004 Helsinki	

IIHF U18 Championships
Gold medal – first place	2002 Piešťany	

Sterling has represented the United States internationally in three junior level competitions, the 2002 U-18 World Championships, and the 2003 and 2004 World Junior Championships. Sterling scored 9 goals and 12 points in eight games helping the U.S. Under-18 team win its first-ever gold medal. In 2004, he scored 3 goals as part of the gold medal-winning US squad.

== Career statistics ==
=== Regular season and playoffs ===
			Regular season					Playoffs
Season	Team	League	GP	G	A	Pts	PIM	GP	G	A	Pts	PIM
1999–2000	Los Angeles Junior Kings	16U AAA	35	45	25	70		—	—	—	—	—
2000–01	U.S. NTDP U17	USDP	13					—	—	—	—	—
2000–01	U.S. NTDP U18	NAHL	47	29	15	44	72	—	—	—	—	—
2001–02	U.S. NTDP U18	USDP	31	21	15	36	18	—	—	—	—	—
2001–02	U.S. NTDP Juniors	USHL	10	6	3	9	8	—	—	—	—	—
2001–02	U.S. NTDP Juniors	NAHL	9	2	1	3	10	—	—	—	—	—
2002–03	Colorado College	WCHA	36	27	11	38	30	—	—	—	—	—
2003–04	Colorado College	WCHA	30	16	12	28	40	—	—	—	—	—
2004–05	Colorado College	WCHA	43	34	29	63	74	—	—	—	—	—
2005–06	Colorado College	WCHA	42	31	24	55	66	—	—	—	—	—
2006–07	Chicago Wolves	AHL	77	55	42	97	96	15	7	5	12	24
2007–08	Atlanta Thrashers	NHL	13	1	2	3	14	—	—	—	—	—
2007–08	Chicago Wolves	AHL	70	38	33	71	116	16	3	5	8	18
2008–09	Atlanta Thrashers	NHL	6	1	0	1	2	—	—	—	—	—
2008–09	Chicago Wolves	AHL	52	17	22	39	84	—	—	—	—	—
2009–10	Chicago Wolves	AHL	55	34	22	56	38	9	4	6	10	4
2010–11	Wilkes–Barre/Scranton Penguins	AHL	65	26	27	53	88	12	2	4	6	10
2010–11	Pittsburgh Penguins	NHL	7	3	2	5	16	—	—	—	—	—
2011–12	Peoria Rivermen	AHL	54	22	26	48	74	—	—	—	—	—
2011–12	St. Louis Blues	NHL	4	0	0	0	0	—	—	—	—	—
2011–12	Portland Pirates	AHL	19	8	6	14	30	—	—	—	—	—
2012–13	Chicago Wolves	AHL	48	24	21	45	50	—	—	—	—	—
2013–14	HV71	SHL	43	11	9	20	28	—	—	—	—	—
2013–14	Örebro HK	SHL	5	1	2	3	4	—	—	—	—	—
2014–15	EC Red Bull Salzburg	EBEL	49	23	28	51	100	13	10	11	21	26
2015–16	EC Red Bull Salzburg	EBEL	46	33	16	49	121	19	9	4	13	71
2016–17	Chicago Wolves	AHL	61	11	18	29	40	4	1	1	2	6
2017–18	Chicago Wolves	AHL	45	15	10	25	46	2	0	0	0	2
AHL totals			546	251	226	477	662	58	17	21	38	64
NHL totals			30	5	4	9	32	—	—	—	—	—

=== International ===
Year	Team	Event	Result	GP	G	A	Pts	PIM
2002	United States	WJC18	1st place, gold medalist(s)	8	9	3	12	4
2003	United States	WJC	4th	7	0	2	2	4
2004	United States	WJC	1st place, gold medalist(s)	6	3	0	3	0
Junior totals				21	12	5	17	8

== Awards and honors ==
Award	Year
College
All-WCHA Rookie Team	2002–03
All-WCHA First Team	2004–05
AHCA West First-Team All-American	2004–05
WCHA All-Tournament Team	2005
All-WCHA First Team	2005–06
AHCA West First-Team All-American	2005–06
AHL
AHL MVP All-Star Classic	2006–07
Dudley "Red" Garret Memorial Trophy	2006–07
Willie Marshall Award	2006–07

== See also ==
- List of select Jewish ice hockey players

Awards and achievements
Preceded by Kellen Briggs	WCHA Most Valuable Player in Tournament; 2005	Succeeded by Jordan Parise
Preceded by Patrick O'Sullivan	Winner of the Dudley "Red" Garret Memorial Trophy; 2007	Succeeded by Teddy Purcell
Preceded by Donald MacLean & Denis Hamel	Winner of the Willie Marshall Award; 2007	Succeeded by Jason Krog
