= Aleš Pařez =

- Born: April 9, 1981 (age 43); Nymburk, Czechoslovakia
- Height: 6 ft 3 in (191 cm)
- Weight: 195 lb (88 kg; 13 st 13 lb)
- Position: Forward
- Shot: Right
- Played for: Bismarck Bobcats; Chicago Steel; University of Alaska-Anchorage; Manchester Phoenix; Milton Keynes Lightning
- Playing career: 2001–2008

Aleš Pařez (born April 9, 1981) is an ex-professional ice hockey player and strength & conditioning coach. Pařez began playing hockey in North America at Wyoming Seminary (Kingston, PA), a boarding school he attended for four years. After graduating high school, Parez spent time in two American Junior programs: first with the Bismarck Bobcats (NAHL) and then with the Chicago Steel of the USHL. In his one and only season with Chicago, Parez managed more than 40 points in just over 60 games.

Parez then played hockey at NCAA level for the University of Alaska Anchorage and featured in 120 games over the four years he spent there, totaling almost 80 points. After his university-level career ended, Parez went through an unsuccessful rookie camp of the Washington Capitals. He then moved back to Europe and signed for the EIHL team Manchester Phoenix, for whom he scored 25 points in 22 games.

Manchester Phoenix released Pařez in March 2007, citing concerns over a shoulder injury sustained a month earlier. He moved to play EPL for the Milton Keynes Lightning for a single season.

In 2015, Pařez returned to the Czech Republic after 20 years abroad and joined HC Bílí Tygři Liberec as a strength & conditioning coach.
