= Barry Tallackson =

American ice hockey player (born 1983)

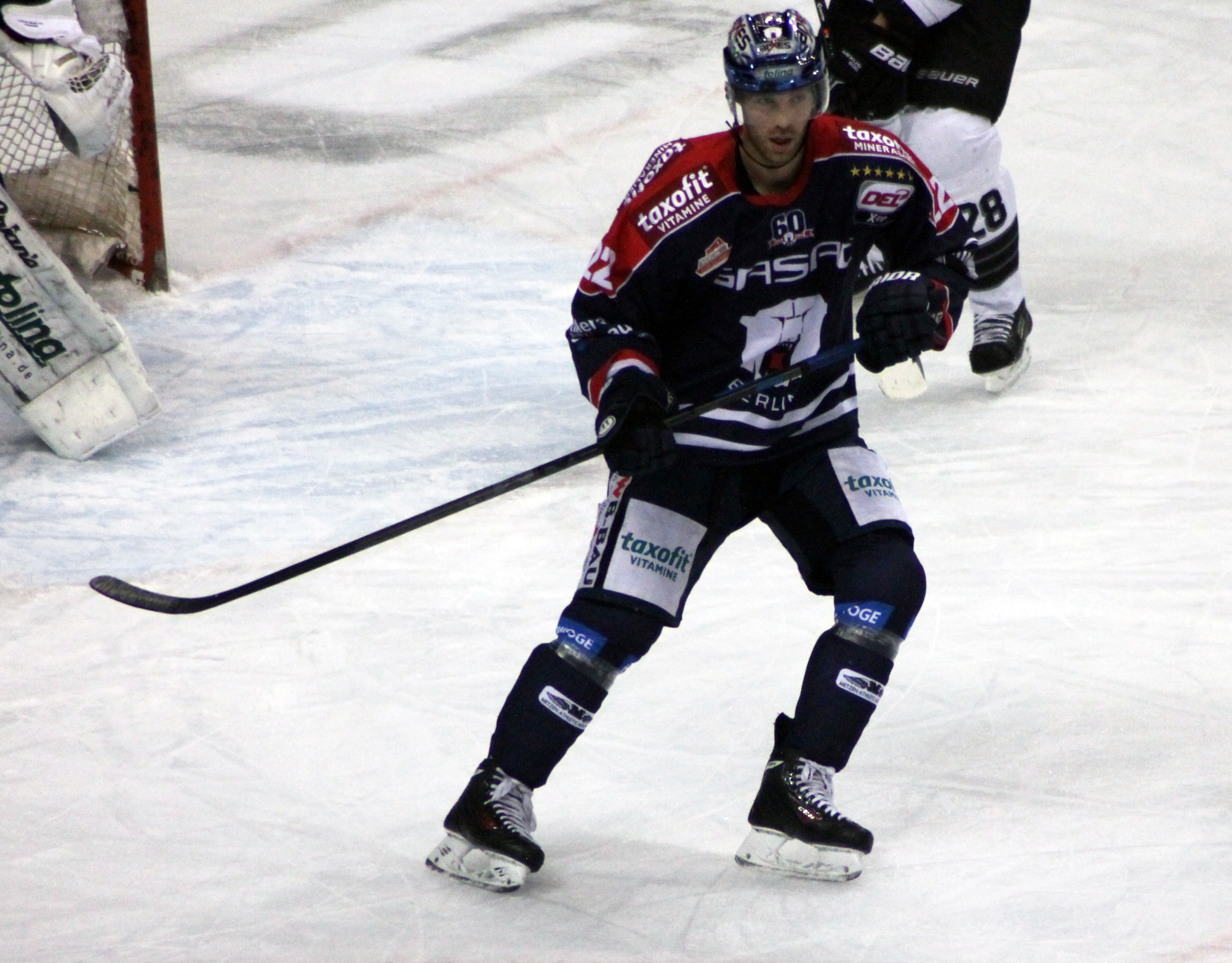
- Born: April 14, 1983 (age 42) Grafton, North Dakota, U.S.
- Height: 6 ft 4 in (193 cm)
- Weight: 210 lb (95 kg; 15 st 0 lb)
- Position: Right wing
- Shot: Right
- Played for: New Jersey Devils; Augsburger Panther; Eisbären Berlin; Oji Eagles
- NHL draft: 53rd overall, 2002; New Jersey Devils
- Playing career: 2005–2018

Barry T. Tallackson (born April 14, 1983) is an American former ice hockey forward. He played 20 games in the National Hockey League with the New Jersey Devils between 2005 and 2009, mainly playing for their American Hockey League affiliate. Tallackson later spent 7 seasons in the Deutsche Eishockey Liga, and last played for the Oji Eagles of the Asia League Ice Hockey (ALIH).

== Playing career ==
Born in Grand Forks, Tallackson was raised in Detroit Lakes, Minnesota and graduated from Johnson High School. Prior to being drafted into the NHL in 2002, Tallackson played for the Minnesota Golden Gophers and won a national championship.

Tallackson was drafted by the New Jersey Devils in the 2nd round, 53rd overall, on June 22, 2002. In December 2008 the Devil's waived their rights to the forward, just weeks after he underwent surgery to correct an irregular heartbeat associated with Wolff-Parkinson-White syndrome. He played with the Devil's farm team Lowell Devils where he scored 11 goals and 10 assists prior to being signed as a free agent by the St. Louis Blues on July 22, 2009.

Tallackson soon was released by St. Louis and later signed with Augsburger Panthers in Germany on July 17, 2010.

On May 2, 2011, after one season with Augsburg, Tallackson signed with reigning champions, Eisbären Berlin, on a one-year contract.

Tallackson's season with the Eisbären saw him finish second in points and goals on the DEL championship winning Eisbären team. Tallackson won MVP of the final series of the playoffs, and saw his contract extended with the Eisbären for another season.

== Career statistics ==
=== Regular season and playoffs ===
			Regular season					Playoffs
Season	Team	League	GP	G	A	Pts	PIM	GP	G	A	Pts	PIM
1999–2000	US NTDP U18	NAHL	53	14	6	20	90	3	1	0	1	8
2000–01	US NTDP Juniors	USHL	23	7	7	14	32	—	—	—	—	—
2001–02	University of Minnesota	WCHA	44	13	10	23	44	—	—	—	—	—
2002–03	University of Minnesota	WCHA	32	9	14	23	18	—	—	—	—	—
2003–04	University of Minnesota	WCHA	44	10	15	25	46	—	—	—	—	—
2004–05	University of Minnesota	WCHA	35	11	8	19	52	—	—	—	—	—
2004–05	Albany River Rats	AHL	4	1	1	2	0	—	—	—	—	—
2005–06	Albany River Rats	AHL	60	14	23	37	62	—	—	—	—	—
2005–06	New Jersey Devils	NHL	10	1	1	2	2	—	—	—	—	—
2006–07	Lowell Devils	AHL	58	10	24	34	33	—	—	—	—	—
2006–07	New Jersey Devils	NHL	3	0	0	0	0	—	—	—	—	—
2007–08	Lowell Devils	AHL	63	22	23	45	54	—	—	—	—	—
2007–08	New Jersey Devils	NHL	3	0	0	0	0	—	—	—	—	—
2008–09	New Jersey Devils	NHL	4	0	0	0	0	—	—	—	—	—
2008–09	Lowell Devils	AHL	56	11	10	21	29	—	—	—	—	—
2009–10	Peoria Rivermen	AHL	74	19	8	27	34	—	—	—	—	—
2010–11	Augsburger Panther	DEL	51	29	26	55	46	—	—	—	—	—
2011–12	Eisbären Berlin	DEL	52	22	18	40	46	13	7	10	17	14
2012–13	Eisbären Berlin	DEL	52	12	27	39	75	13	3	4	7	37
2013–14	Eisbären Berlin	DEL	50	18	22	40	46	3	0	0	0	2
2014–15	Eisbären Berlin	DEL	51	11	19	30	85	3	0	1	1	0
2015–16	Eisbären Berlin	DEL	52	16	22	38	36	7	0	0	0	2
2016–17	Eisbären Berlin	DEL	51	2	8	10	32	4	1	0	1	2
2017–18	Oji Eagles	ALH	28	5	12	17	24	12	3	1	4	2
AHL totals			315	77	89	166	212	—	—	—	—	—
NHL totals			20	1	1	2	2	—	—	—	—	—
DEL totals			359	110	142	252	366	43	11	15	26	57

=== International ===
Year	Team	Event	Result	GP	G	A	Pts	PIM
2000	United States	U17	4th	6	0	1	1
2001	United States	WJC18	6th	6	2	3	5	2
2003	United States	WJC	4th	7	3	0	3	2
Junior totals				19	5	4	9	4
