= Bobby Goepfert =

American ice hockey goaltender (born 1983)

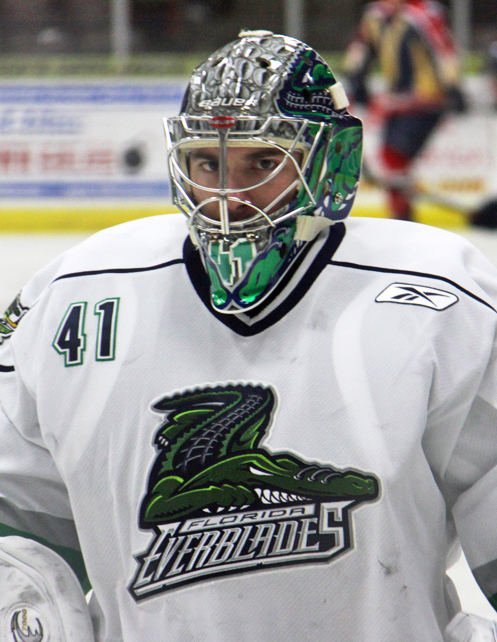
- Born: May 9, 1983 (age 43) Kings Park, New York, U.S.
- Height: 5 ft 10 in (178 cm)
- Weight: 170 lb (77 kg; 12 st 2 lb)
- Position: Goaltender
- Caught: Right
- Played for: Hershey Bears; Portland Pirates; EC Red Bull Salzburg; Hamburg Freezers; Charlotte Checkers; Düsseldorfer EG
- NHL draft: 171st overall, 2002; Pittsburgh Penguins
- Playing career: 2007–2016
- Coaching career

Biographical details
- Education: Providence College; St. Cloud State

Coaching career (HC unless noted)
- 2020–2022: Long Island (assistant)

Bobby Goepfert (born May 9, 1983) is an American ice hockey executive and former professional ice hockey goaltender who currently serves as the General Manager for the Chicago Steel of the United States Hockey League (USHL). He was selected by the Pittsburgh Penguins in the 6th round (171st overall) of the 2002 NHL entry draft.

Goepfert played with the Florida Everblades in the ECHL and the Charlotte Checkers in the American Hockey League (AHL) during the 2010-11 season; and the Hamburg Freezers in the Deutsche Eishockey Liga (DEL) during the 2009-10 season.

== Awards and honors ==
Award	Year
All-WCHA First Team	2005–06
AHCA West Second-Team All-American	2005–06
All-WCHA First Team	2006–07
AHCA West Second-Team All-American	2006–07
