= Rastislav Špirko =

Slovak ice hockey player

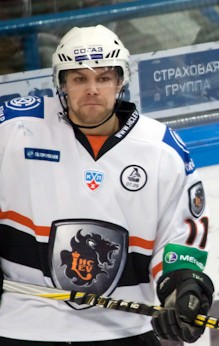
- Born: 21 June 1984 (age 42) Martin, Czechoslovakia
- Height: 5 ft 9 in (175 cm)
- Weight: 174 lb (79 kg; 12 st 6 lb)
- Position: Forward
- Shoots: Left
- Czech 2.liga team Former teams: HC Opava; MHC Martin; HC Slovan Ústečtí Lvi; HC Dynamo Pardubice; HC Lev Poprad; Avtomobilist Yekaterinburg; HC Spartak Moscow; Amur Khabarovsk; HC Kometa Brno; HC Nové Zámky; HKM Zvolen; HK Dukla Trenčín; HK Poprad
- Playing career: 2007–present

Rastislav Špirko (born 21 June 1984) is a Slovak professional ice hockey player for HC Opava of the Czech 2.liga.

== Career statistics ==
=== Regular season and playoffs ===
			Regular season					Playoffs
Season	Team	League	GP	G	A	Pts	PIM	GP	G	A	Pts	PIM

== Awards and honors ==
Award	Year
WCHA All-Tournament Team	2005
