= Chad Anderson (ice hockey) =

American ice hockey player (born 1982)

- Born: June 16, 1982 (age 44) Chisago City, Minnesota
- Height: 6 ft 4 in (193 cm)
- Weight: 217 lb (98 kg; 15 st 7 lb)
- Position: Defense
- Shot: Right
- Played for: Philadelphia Phantoms; Hamilton Bulldogs; Lake Erie Monsters
- NHL draft: Undrafted
- Playing career: 2007–2012

Chad Anderson (born June 16, 1982) is an American retired professional ice hockey defenseman who played 165 games in the American Hockey League with the Philadelphia Phantoms, Hamilton Bulldogs and the Lake Erie Monsters.

== Playing career ==
Anderson first played in the USHL for the Twin City Vulcans in 1997–98 and for the Tri-City Storm from 2000–03. He then committed to a collegiate career playing for the University of Alaska-Anchorage in the WCHA. After completing his four-year career with the Seawolves, Chad made his professional debut at the end of the 2006–07 season, signing an amateur contract with the Las Vegas Wranglers of the ECHL for a couple of games.

In his rookie professional season in 2007–08, he played in the AHL with the Philadelphia Phantoms.

On August 6, 2008 Anderson was signed as a free agent by the Montreal Canadiens to a one-year contract and consequently played the 2008–09 and 2009–10 seasons with the Canadiens' top farm team, the Hamilton Bulldogs.

A free agent prior to the 2010–11 season, Chad unsuccessfully attended the Peoria Rivermen training camp before he was reassigned to earn a contract with ECHL affiliate, the Alaska Aces. After starting the year with the Aces, he was temporarily loaned to the depleted Lake Erie Monsters of the AHL for two games, before returning to the Aces blueline. As a big physical force on the defense, Anderson also helped to contribute 29 points in 67 games, and later claim the ECHL championship, the Kelly Cup.

On September 13, 2011, Anderson re-signed with the Aces for the succeeding 2011–12 season. Evolving into a pivotal leader for the Aces, Anderson spent the entire season with the club posting 24 points in 56 games.

Following the season, Anderson ended his professional career, opting to remain in his adopted home through hockey in Alaska.

== Career statistics ==
			Regular season					Playoffs
Season	Team	League	GP	G	A	Pts	PIM	GP	G	A	Pts	PIM
1997–98	Twin City Vulcans	USHL	53	7	4	11	33	—	—	—	—	—
2000–01	Tri-City Storm	USHL	50	0	1	1	34	7	0	1	1	2
2001–02	Tri-City Storm	USHL	60	3	10	13	53	—	—	—	—	—
2002–03	Tri-City Storm	USHL	60	8	20	28	119	3	0	0	0	10
2003–04	U. of Alaska-Anchorage	WCHA	38	2	6	8	24	—	—	—	—	—
2004–05	U. of Alaska-Anchorage	WCHA	36	4	11	15	46	—	—	—	—	—
2005–06	U. of Alaska-Anchorage	WCHA	30	3	3	6	49	—	—	—	—	—
2006–07	U. of Alaska-Anchorage	WCHA	34	7	13	20	96	—	—	—	—	—
2006–07	Las Vegas Wranglers	ECHL	2	0	0	0	0	—	—	—	—	—
2007–08	Philadelphia Phantoms	AHL	55	2	11	13	35	12	0	2	2	8
2008–09	Hamilton Bulldogs	AHL	56	5	2	7	55	5	0	2	2	6
2009–10	Hamilton Bulldogs	AHL	52	1	6	7	26	18	0	3	3	8
2010–11	Alaska Aces	ECHL	67	4	25	29	77	13	2	3	5	15
2010–11	Lake Erie Monsters	AHL	2	0	0	0	0	—	—	—	—	—
2011–12	Alaska Aces	ECHL	56	5	19	24	53	10	1	2	3	14
AHL totals			165	8	19	27	116	35	0	7	7	22

== Awards and honours ==
Award	Year
ECHL
Kelly Cup	2011
