= Nathan Lawson (ice hockey) =

Canadian ice hockey player

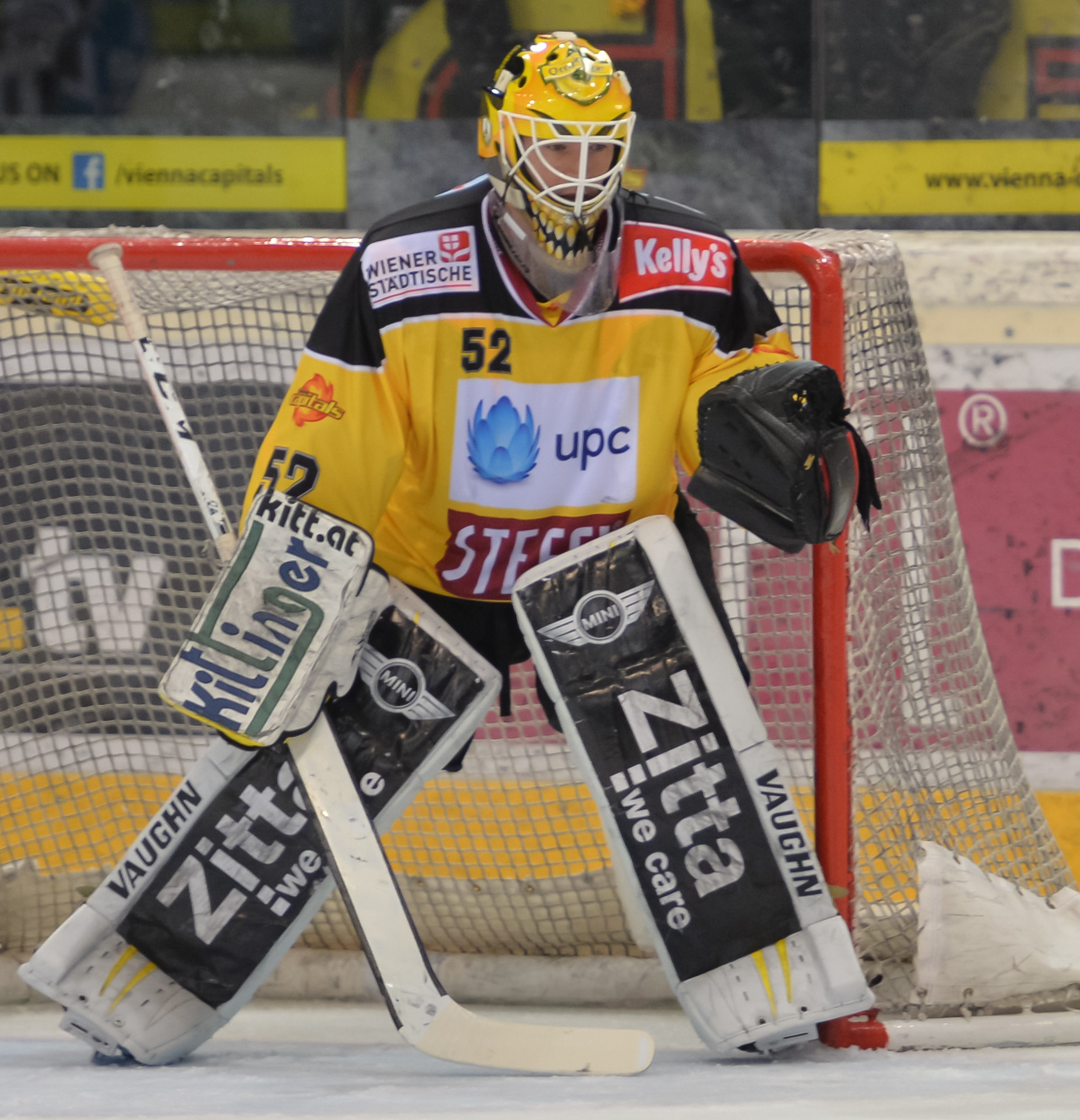
- Lawson with the Vienna Capitals in 2016
- Born: September 29, 1983 (age 43) Calgary, Alberta, Canada
- Height: 6 ft 2 in (188 cm)
- Weight: 191 lb (87 kg; 13 st 9 lb)
- Position: Goaltender
- Catches: Left
- Liiga team Former teams: HPK; New York Islanders; Ottawa Senators; Dornbirner EC; Vienna Capitals
- NHL draft: Undrafted
- Playing career: 2007–present

Nathan Lawson (born September 29, 1983) is a Canadian professional ice hockey player. A goaltender, Lawson is currently playing with HPK in the Finnish top-flight Liiga. Lawson has previously played in the National Hockey League (NHL) with the New York Islanders and Ottawa Senators.

== Playing career ==
Lawson started his career as a hockey player at the Olds Grizzlys, where he was active from 2001 to 2004 in the Alberta Junior Hockey League. He then spent three years at the University of Alaska Anchorage, and played in parallel for their hockey team in the National Collegiate Athletic Association play. In the 2007–08 season the goalkeeper made his debut in professional hockey, initially for the Phoenix RoadRunners and then for the Utah Grizzlies in the ECHL.

From the 2008–09 season through 2010–11, Lawson was goaltender for the Bridgeport Sound Tigers in the American Hockey League (AHL), the affiliate of the New York Islanders of the NHL. Lawson made his NHL debut with the Islanders on December 18, 2010, in a 4–3 shootout loss to the Phoenix Coyotes, and played a total of ten games for the Islanders in the 2010–11 season.

On July 5, 2011, Lawson signed a one-year, two-way contract with the Montreal Canadiens. He spent the season with the Hamilton Bulldogs, playing 57 games and recording five shutouts. He signed a one-year, two-way contract with Ottawa on July 16, 2012.

On October 2, 2014, Lawson as a free agent ventured abroad to sign an initial try-out contract with Austrian club, Dornbirner EC of the EBEL. Lawson secured the starting position with the Bulldogs, and appeared in 37 games in the 2014–15 season, recording 19 wins.

On May 30, 2015, Lawson opted to continue in the EBEL, signing a one-year contract with fellow Austrian club, the Vienna Capitals. He made 44 EBEL appearances for the Vienna team during the 2015–16 season. He left the club after the season to move to Finland, where he penned a deal with HPK of the country's top-tier Liiga.

== Career statistics ==
=== Regular season and playoffs ===
			Regular season										Playoffs
Season	Team	League	GP	W	L	T	OTL	MIN	GA	SO	GAA	SV%	GP	W	L	MIN	GA	SO	GAA	SV%
2002–03	Olds Grizzlys	AJHL	56	—	—	—	—	—	—	—	—	—	—	—	—	—	—	—	—	—
2003–04	Olds Grizzlys	AJHL	54	—	—	—	—	—	—	—	—	—	—	—	—	—	—	—	—	—
2004–05	University of Alaska Anchorage	WCHA	27	7	15	3	—	1482	82	1	3.32	.914	—	—	—	—	—	—	—	—
2005–06	University of Alaska Anchorage	WCHA	21	4	11	3	—	1063	61	1	3.44	.908	—	—	—	—	—	—	—	—
2006–07	University of Alaska Anchorage	WCHA	27	10	15	2	—	1523	77	0	3.03	.893	—	—	—	—	—	—	—	—
2007–08	Phoenix Roadrunners	ECHL	5	3	2	—	0	279	14	1	3.01	.910	—	—	—	—	—	—	—	—
2007–08	Utah Grizzlies	ECHL	24	14	7	—	1	1390	67	1	2.89	.906	10	5	4	543	26	2	2.87	.905
2008–09	Utah Grizzlies	ECHL	3	2	0	—	0	158	6	0	2.28	.918	—	—	—	—	—	—	—	—
2008–09	Bridgeport Sound Tigers	AHL	31	19	9	—	2	1723	62	2	2.16	.927	2	0	2	123	8	0	3.89	.833
2009–10	Bridgeport Sound Tigers	AHL	36	16	16	—	3	2121	89	1	2.52	.922	1	0	0	46	2	0	2.63	.938
2010–11	New York Islanders	NHL	10	1	4	—	2	384	26	0	4.06	.893	—	—	—	—	—	—	—	—
2010–11	Bridgeport Sound Tigers	AHL	16	6	5	—	4	953	46	0	2.90	.913	—	—	—	—	—	—	—	—
2011–12	Hamilton Bulldogs	AHL	44	19	17	—	4	2402	103	5	2.57	.914	—	—	—	—	—	—	—	—
2012–13	Binghamton Senators	AHL	23	12	6	—	2	1258	46	2	2.19	.938	3	0	3	165	8	0	2.60	.905
2012–13	Elmira Jackals	ECHL	1	1	0	—	0	60	2	0	2.00	.941	—	—	—	—	—	—	—	—
2013–14	Binghamton Senators	AHL	30	15	8	—	1	1571	80	0	3.05	.908	—	—	—	—	—	—	—	—
2013–14	Ottawa Senators	NHL	1	0	0	—	0	12	2	0	10.00	.800	—	—	—	—	—	—	—	—
2014–15	Dornbirner EC	EBEL	37	19	15	—	0	2044	98	1	2.88	.920	—	—	—	—	—	—	—	—
2015–16	Vienna Capitals	EBEL	40	—	—	—	—	2336	88	0	2.26	.924	4	1	3	271	11	0	2.43	.917
NHL totals			11	1	4	—	0	396	28	0	4.24	.889	—	—	—	—	—	—	—	—

== Awards and honours ==
Award	Year	Ref.
All-WCHA Rookie Team	2004–05	
AHL All-Rookie Team	2008–09	
