= 2005–06 Wisconsin Badgers men's ice hockey season =

American college ice hockey season

NCAA Division I National Champion College Hockey Showcase, Champion Badger Showdown, Champion NCAA Tournament, Champion
- Conference: T–2nd WCHA
- Home ice: Kohl Center

Rankings
- USCHO: 2
- USA Today: 1

Record
- Overall: 30–10–3
- Conference: 17–8–3
- Home: 13–6–1
- Road: 11–3–2
- Neutral: 6–1–0

Coaches and captains
- Head coach: Mike Eaves
- Assistant coaches: Bill Howard Jr. Mark Osiecki; Kevin Patrick
- Captain: Adam Burish
- Alternate captain(s): Tom Gilbert; Andrew Joudrey; Ryan MacMurchy

The 2005–06 Wisconsin Badgers men's ice hockey season was the 57th season of play for the program and 37th in the WCHA. They represented the University of Wisconsin–Madison in the 2005–06 NCAA Division I men's ice hockey season. They were coached by Mike Eaves, in his 4th season and played their home games at Kohl Center. The team won the 2006 NCAA Division I men's ice hockey tournament, the 6th title in program history.

== Season ==
Wisconsin entered the season with a great deal of talent on the roster but not much to show for their efforts. Despite having about a dozen players selected in the NHL entry draft, the Badgers had flamed out in postseason play over the previous two years. They also had to replace previous starter Bernd Brückler, though they had a capable understudy in Brian Elliott. Wisconsin received a top-10 ranking in the preseason, however, they were already being downgraded before they played a single game. They dipped even further when they split their opening weekend but after that the team began to pull together.

The team didn't play its second opponent until the fourth weekend of the season but the time off appeared to benefit the club. After dropping their second game of the season, the Badgers didn't lose again until December 9. Over a 14-game stretch, Wisconsin appeared to be unbeatable. Robbie Earl and Joe Pavelski led a solid offense but it was on the back end that the Badgers made their mark. As soon as he assumed the starting role, Elliot was nigh impossible to beat in goal. Through the first 16 games of the season, he allowed more than 2 goals in just 1 game and was leading the nation with a sparkling 1.38 goals against average. During that stretch, the Badgers had gone 7–0–1 against ranked teams, including two separate top-ranked clubs. The result was that by December, Wisconsin was the unanimous #1 team in the nation. A surprising loss to lowly Michigan Tech ended their streak but the Badgers won the next five game afterwards to pad their résumé.

With Wisconsin cruising to the top seed and Brian Elliott seemingly a shoo-in for the Hobey Baker Award, the team was dealt a serious blow in mid-January. After sweeping #5 Colorado College, Elliott was injured at practice when a teammate slid into him. The goalie was ruled out for 3–4 weeks and it fell to freshman backup Shane Connelly to hold the fort until then. Much to their misfortune, Wisconsin's next four games were against ranked teams and the Badgers fell in each match. After being thrown into the fire, Connelly recovered to earn three wins over his next four games before Elliott was finally able to return. Unfortunately, it took Elliott more than a week to get back into game shape and he ended up allowing 17 goals over a 3-game stretch, a little more than half of the 31 he had allowed in the first 22 games. With the Badgers unable to win a conference title at the time, the final weekend of the season would only serve as a tune-up for the postseason. Luckily, Elliott appeared to have regained his early-season form by allowing just 1 goal against a ranked St. Cloud State squad.

=== Conference tournament ===
The Badgers opened against Michigan Tech and completely dominated both games. While the score was close in the second affair, Wisconsin outshot the Huskies 76–41 and controlled both games from start to finish. They met North Dakota in the semifinal and got off to a good start, scoring twice in the first 11 minutes. The Fighting Sioux fought back and over a 6-minute span, scored three goals to take the lead early in the second. The teams exchanged goals at the end of the middle frame, leaving the Badgers just one goal short with 20 minutes to play. The third was a sleepy period with no penalties or goals. Wisconsin was unable even the score and saw their chance at a conference championship fade away.

Wisconsin took their frustrations out on regular season champion Minnesota in the consolation game, posting a 4–0 victory over their long-time rival. The win helped Wisconsin earn the top overall seed for the NCAA tournament (Minnesota got the #2 seed) and were given the best possible draw for their first game.

=== NCAA tournament ===
Elliott continued to roll in the team's match against Bemidji State, recording his seventh shutout of the season. The next game came against Cornell and the match pitting two of the top defensive teams in the nation lived up to its billing. Elliott and the Badgers looked to be in control for extended sections of the game and the Big Red were unable to solve the Wisconsin netminder. Unfortunately, The Badgers too were unable to score as David McKee stopped all 37 shots in regulation. The two teams continued to stymie one another in overtime and the game went on into the night. Just past the mid-way point of the third overtime, Jack Skille scored the game's first goal, ending the second-longest game in Badger history in their favor. The game is also notable for being scoreless for the longest period in NCAA history (111:13).

The extended match didn't harm Wisconsin's tournament chances as the team had a week and a half off before the start of the Frozen Four. Wisconsin lucked into a de facto home game for the tournament as Milwaukee was host for the championship rounds. In front of a very partisan crowd, the Badgers took on Maine and looked every bit of the world-beaters that they had earlier in the year. After exchanging goals in the first, Wisconsin was outshot in the second but still managed to score two special team markers to take a solid lead. The Bears cut into their advantage in the third but a pair of goals put the game out of reach and sent Wisconsin to their first title game in 14 years.

With the championship on the line, Wisconsin faced off against Boston College. The Badgers pressed the Eagles all game long, forcing BC to take 10 separate minor penalties, 8 of which led to Wisconsin power plays. It was, however, Boston College who got on the board first, opening the scoring 9 minutes into the game. Robbie Earl tied the game early in the second but, despite exchanging chances, neither team was able to score for the next 28 minutes. midway through the third, while on their sixth man-advantage of the game, Wisconsin's Tom Gilbert broke the tie and gave the Badgers their first lead of the game. Two additional BC penalties helped stall the Eagles' comeback attempt and Wisconsin was able to run out the clock with a 2–1 win, capturing the program's sixth National Championship.

Brian Elliott finished the season setting several Wisconsin records including goals against average (1.55), save percentage (.938), and shutouts (8), all of which are still program bests (as of 2022).

== Departures ==
Player	Position	Nationality	Cause
Matt Auffrey	Forward	United States	Returned to juniors after 1 game (Kitchener Rangers)
Bernd Brückler	Goaltender	Austria	Graduation (signed with Hartford Wolf Pack)
John Funk	Forward	United States	Graduation (retired)
Mark Heatley	Forward	Germany	Transferred to Toronto
Luke Kohtala	Forward	Canada	Left program (retired)
Ken Rowe	Forward	United States	Returned to juniors (Des Moines Buccaneers); transferred to Army
Jeff Slinde	Defenseman	United States	Left program (retired)
Pete Talafous	Forward	United States	Left program (retired)

== Recruiting ==
Player	Position	Nationality	Age	Notes
Shane Connelly	Goaltender	United States	18	Cheltenham, PA
Tom Gorowsky	Forward	United States	19	Lino Lakes, MN
Jeff Henderson	Goaltender	United States	19	Menomonie, WI
Ryan Jeffery	Goaltender	United States	18	Madison, WI
Jack Skille	Forward	United States	18	Madison, WI; selected 7th overall in 2005
Ben Street	Forward	Canada	18	Coquitlam, BC

== Roster ==
As of October 1, 2005.

No.	Nat.	Player	Class	Pos	Height	Weight	DoB	Hometown	Previous team	NHL rights
1		Brian Elliott	Sophomore	G	6' 2" (1.88 m)	209 lb (95 kg)	1985-04-09	Newmarket, Ontario	Ajax Axemen (OPJHL)	OTT, 291st overall 2003
3		Matt Olinger	Junior	D	6' 1" (1.85 m)	201 lb (91 kg)	1983-04-03	Madison, Wisconsin	Cedar Rapids Roughriders (USHL)	—
4		Davis Drewiske	Sophomore	D	6' 2" (1.88 m)	223 lb (101 kg)	1984-11-22	Hudson, Wisconsin	Des Moines Buccaneers (USHL)	—
5		Jeff Likens	Junior	D	5' 11" (1.8 m)	185 lb (84 kg)	1985-08-28	Barrington, Illinois	USNTDP (NAHL)	—
6		Josh Engel	Sophomore	D	6' 3" (1.91 m)	203 lb (92 kg)	1984-07-07	Rice Lake, Wisconsin	Green Bay Gamblers (USHL)	—
7		Joe Piskula	Sophomore	D	6' 3" (1.91 m)	205 lb (93 kg)	1984-07-05	Antigo, Wisconsin	Des Moines Buccaneers (USHL)	—
8		Joe Pavelski	Sophomore	F	5' 11" (1.8 m)	194 lb (88 kg)	1984-07-11	Plover, Wisconsin	Waterloo Black Hawks (USHL)	SJS, 205th overall 2003
9		Matt Auffrey	Sophomore	F	6' 2" (1.88 m)	203 lb (92 kg)	1986-01-03	Cincinnati, Ohio	USNTDP (NAHL)	ANA, 172nd overall 2004
10		Robbie Earl	Junior	F	6' 0" (1.83 m)	194 lb (88 kg)	1985-06-02	Chicago, Illinois	USNTDP (NAHL)	TOR, 187th overall 2004
11		Jake Dowell	Junior	F	6' 0" (1.83 m)	201 lb (91 kg)	1985-03-04	Eau Claire, Wisconsin	USNTDP (NAHL)	CHI, 140th overall 2004
12		Jack Skille	Freshman	F	6' 1" (1.85 m)	207 lb (94 kg)	1987-05-19	Madison, Wisconsin	USNTDP (NAHL)	CHI, 7th overall 2005
14		Tom Gilbert (A)	Senior	D	6' 2" (1.88 m)	205 lb (93 kg)	1983-01-10	Bloomington, Minnesota	Chicago Steel (USHL)	COL, 129th overall 2002
15		Tom Gorowsky	Freshman	D	6' 0" (1.83 m)	194 lb (88 kg)	1986-04-08	Lino Lakes, Minnesota	Sioux Falls Stampede (USHL)	—
16		Adam Burish (C)	Senior	F	6' 1" (1.85 m)	194 lb (88 kg)	1983-01-06	Madison, Wisconsin	Green Bay Gamblers (USHL)	CHI, 282nd overall 2002
18		Matthew Ford	Sophomore	F	6' 1" (1.85 m)	207 lb (94 kg)	1984-10-09	Los Angeles, California	Sioux Falls Stampede (USHL)	CHI, 256th overall 2004
19		Ryan MacMurchy (A)	Senior	F	6' 2" (1.88 m)	207 lb (94 kg)	1983-04-27	Regina, Saskatchewan	Notre Dame Hounds (SJHL)	STL, 284th overall 2002
20		Kyle Klubertanz	Sophomore	D	6' 0" (1.83 m)	181 lb (82 kg)	1985-09-23	Sun Prairie, Wisconsin	Green Bay Gamblers (USHL)	ANA, 74th overall 2004
21		Andy Brandt	Junior	F	6' 1" (1.85 m)	183 lb (83 kg)	1983-06-01	Wausau, Wisconsin	Pittsburgh Forge (NAHL)	—
22		Ben Street	Freshman	F	6' 0" (1.83 m)	190 lb (86 kg)	1987-02-13	Coquitlam, British Columbia	Salmon Arm Silverbacks (BCHL)	—
24		Andrew Joudrey	Junior	F	5' 10" (1.78 m)	185 lb (84 kg)	1984-07-15	Halifax, Nova Scotia	Notre Dame Hounds (SJHL)	WSH, 249th overall 2003
25		A. J. Degenhardt	Senior	F	5' 10" (1.78 m)	183 lb (83 kg)	1982-08-28	La Crosse, Wisconsin	Green Bay Gamblers (USHL)	—
27		Ross Carlson	Junior	F	5' 11" (1.8 m)	185 lb (84 kg)	1982-02-21	Duluth, Minnesota	Waterloo Black Hawks (USHL)	—
28		Jeff Slinde	Sophomore	D	6' 0" (1.83 m)	187 lb (85 kg)	1984-10-13	Monona, Wisconsin	Springfield Spirit (NAHL)	—
29		Jeff Henderson	Freshman	G	6' 2" (1.88 m)	183 lb (83 kg)	1986-09-21	Menomonie, Wisconsin	Menomonie High (USHS–WI)	—
30		Ryan Jeffery	Freshman	G	6' 1" (1.85 m)	185 lb (84 kg)	1986-10-21	Madison, Wisconsin	Madison Memorial High (USHS–WI)	—
31		Nick Licari	Senior	F	5' 8" (1.73 m)	183 lb (83 kg)	1984-01-19	Duluth, Minnesota	Duluth East (USHS–MN)	—
35		Shane Connelly	Freshman	G	5' 9" (1.75 m)	176 lb (80 kg)	1987-03-16	Cheltenham, Pennsylvania	Chicago Steel (USHL)	—

== Standings ==
2005–06 Western Collegiate Hockey Association standings
	Conference							Overall					
	GP	W	L	T	PTS	GF	GA	GP	W	L	T	GF	GA
#8 Minnesota†	28	20	5	3	43	107	64	41	27	9	5	169	105
Denver	28	17	8	3	37	98	78	39	21	15	3	125	110
#1 Wisconsin	28	17	8	3	37	98	60	43	30	10	3	145	79
#3 North Dakota*	28	16	12	0	32	104	76	46	29	16	1	164	109
#11 Colorado College	28	15	11	2	32	94	75	42	24	16	2	143	109
#15 St. Cloud State	28	13	13	2	28	79	62	42	22	16	4	134	99
Minnesota State-Mankato	28	12	13	3	27	93	88	39	17	18	4	126	121
Michigan Tech	28	6	16	6	18	54	113	38	7	25	6	74	149
Minnesota–Duluth	28	6	19	3	15	61	114	40	11	25	4	97	148
Alaska–Anchorage	28	4	21	3	11	51	110	36	6	27	3	68	138
Championship: North Dakota † indicates conference regular season champion * indicates conference tournament champion Final rankings: USA Today/USA Hockey Magazine Top 15 Poll

== Schedule and results ==
Date	Time	Opponent^{#}	Rank^{#}	Site	TV	Decision	Result	Attendance	Record
Regular Season
October 7	7:07 PM	vs. St. Lawrence*	#10	Kohl Center • Madison, Wisconsin		Elliott	W 3–2 ^{OT}	10,398	1–0–0
October 8	7:07 PM	vs. St. Lawrence*	#10	Kohl Center • Madison, Wisconsin		Elliott	L 1–2 ^{OT}	12,420	1–1–0
October 21	7:07 PM	at St. Cloud State	#13	National Hockey Center • St. Cloud, Minnesota		Elliott	T 2–2 ^{OT}	5,981	1–1–1 (0–0–1)
October 22	7:07 PM	at St. Cloud State	#13	National Hockey Center • St. Cloud, Minnesota		Elliott	W 3–1	5,988	2–1–1 (1–0–1)
October 28	7:07 PM	vs. Alaska–Anchorage	#12	Kohl Center • Madison, Wisconsin		Elliott	W 6–1	11,081	3–1–1 (2–0–1)
October 29	7:07 PM	vs. Alaska–Anchorage	#12	Kohl Center • Madison, Wisconsin		Elliott	W 5–1	12,622	4–1–1 (3–0–1)
November 4	7:37 PM	at #5 North Dakota	#9	Ralph Engelstad Arena • Grand Forks, North Dakota		Elliott	W 4–2	10,972	5–1–1 (4–0–1)
November 5	7:07 PM	at #5 North Dakota	#9	Ralph Engelstad Arena • Grand Forks, North Dakota		Elliott	W 4–1	11,224	6–1–1 (5–0–1)
November 11	7:07 PM	vs. #1 Colorado College	#5	Kohl Center • Madison, Wisconsin		Elliott	T 2–2 ^{OT}	13,817	6–1–2 (5–0–2)
November 12	8:07 PM	vs. #1 Colorado College	#5	Kohl Center • Madison, Wisconsin		Elliott	W 3–0	15,237	7–1–2 (6–0–2)
November 19	7:07 PM	vs. Minnesota State–Mankato	#2	Kohl Center • Madison, Wisconsin		Elliott	W 2–1	12,743	8–1–2 (7–0–2)
November 20	8:07 PM	vs. Minnesota State–Mankato	#2	Kohl Center • Madison, Wisconsin		Elliott	W 3–2	11,522	9–1–2 (8–0–2)
College Hockey Showcase
November 25	6:05 PM	at #18 Michigan State*	#2	Munn Ice Arena • East Lansing, Michigan (College Hockey Showcase Game 1)		Elliott	W 3–1	4,807	10–1–2
November 26	6:35 PM	at #1 Michigan*	#2	Yost Ice Arena • Ann Arbor, Michigan (College Hockey Showcase Game 2)		Elliott	W 3–1	6,680	11–1–2
December 2	7:07 PM	at #4 Minnesota	#1	3M Arena at Mariucci • Minneapolis, Minnesota (Rivalry)		Elliott	W 4–3	10,195	12–1–2 (9–0–2)
December 3	7:07 PM	at #4 Minnesota	#1	3M Arena at Mariucci • Minneapolis, Minnesota (Rivalry)		Elliott	W 4–0	10,203	13–1–2 (10–0–2)
December 9	7:07 PM	vs. Michigan Tech	#1	Kohl Center • Madison, Wisconsin		Elliott	L 2–4	12,718	13–2–2 (10–1–2)
December 10	8:07 PM	vs. Michigan Tech	#1	Kohl Center • Madison, Wisconsin		Elliott	W 7–0	14,670	14–2–2 (11–1–2)
December 16	7:07 PM	vs. USNTDP*	#1	Kohl Center • Madison, Wisconsin (Exhibition)		Connelly	W 6–5	11,733	
Badger Showdown
December 30	7:07 PM	vs. Western Michigan*	#1	Kohl Center • Madison, Wisconsin (Badger Showdown Semifinal)		Elliott	W 4–1	13,302	15–2–2
December 31	7:07 PM	vs. Northern Michigan*	#1	Kohl Center • Madison, Wisconsin (Badger Showdown Championship)		Elliott	W 5–1	13,693	16–2–2
January 13	8:37 PM	at #5 Colorado College	#1	Colorado Springs World Arena • Colorado Springs, Colorado		Elliott	W 3–2	7,552	17–2–2 (12–1–2)
January 14	8:07 PM	at #5 Colorado College	#1	Colorado Springs World Arena • Colorado Springs, Colorado		Elliott	W 9–1	7,361	18–2–2 (13–1–2)
January 20	7:07 PM	vs. #19 Denver	#1	Kohl Center • Madison, Wisconsin		Connelly	L 0–1	15,237	18–3–2 (13–2–2)
January 21	7:07 PM	vs. #19 Denver	#1	Kohl Center • Madison, Wisconsin		Connelly	L 2–4	15,237	18–4–2 (13–3–2)
January 27	7:07 PM	vs. #4 Minnesota	#2	Kohl Center • Madison, Wisconsin (Rivalry)		Connelly	L 4–5	15,237	18–5–2 (13–4–2)
January 28	7:07 PM	vs. #4 Minnesota	#2	Kohl Center • Madison, Wisconsin (Rivalry)		Connelly	L 1–3	15,237	18–6–2 (13–5–2)
February 3	7:07 PM	at Minnesota–Duluth	#4	Duluth Entertainment Convention Center • Duluth, Minnesota		Connelly	W 7–2	5,315	19–6–2 (14–5–2)
February 4	7:07 PM	at Minnesota–Duluth	#4	Duluth Entertainment Convention Center • Duluth, Minnesota		Connelly	L 1–4	5,370	19–7–2 (14–6–2)
February 11	3:07 PM	vs. Ohio State*	#4	Lambeau Field • Green Bay, Wisconsin (Frozen Tundra Hockey Classic)		Connelly	W 4–2	40,890	20–7–2
February 17	6:07 PM	at Michigan Tech	#3	MacInnes Student Ice Arena • Houghton, Michigan		Connelly	W 5–0	2,418	21–7–2 (15–6–2)
February 18	7:07 PM	at Michigan Tech	#3	MacInnes Student Ice Arena • Houghton, Michigan		Elliott	T 4–4 ^{OT}	2,979	21–7–3 (15–6–3)
February 24	7:37 PM	at Minnesota State–Mankato	#2	Midwest Wireless Civic Center • Mankato, Minnesota		Elliott	L 4–6	4,313	21–8–3 (15–7–3)
February 25	7:07 PM	at Minnesota State–Mankato	#2	Midwest Wireless Civic Center • Mankato, Minnesota		Elliott	L 3–7	5,007	21–9–3 (15–8–3)
March 3	7:07 PM	vs. #19 St. Cloud State	#5	Kohl Center • Madison, Wisconsin		Elliott	W 1–0	15,237	22–9–3 (16–8–3)
March 4	7:07 PM	vs. #19 St. Cloud State	#5	Kohl Center • Madison, Wisconsin		Elliott	W 3–1	15,237	23–9–3 (17–8–3)
WCHA Tournament
March 10	7:07 PM	vs. Michigan Tech*	#4	Kohl Center • Madison, Wisconsin (WCHA First Round Game 1)		Elliott	W 3–1	15,237	24–9–3
March 11	7:07 PM	vs. Michigan Tech*	#4	Kohl Center • Madison, Wisconsin (WCHA First Round Game 2)		Elliott	W 1–0	13,188	25–9–3
March 17	2:37 PM	vs. #8 North Dakota*	#3	Xcel Energy Center • Saint Paul, Minnesota (WCHA Semifinal)		Elliott	L 3–4	16,468	25–10–3
March 18	2:37 PM	vs. #1 Minnesota*	#3	Xcel Energy Center • Saint Paul, Minnesota (Rivalry; WCHA Third Place Game)		Elliott	W 4–0	16,134	26–10–3
NCAA Tournament
March 25	1:30 PM	vs. Bemidji State*	#2	Resch Center • Green Bay, Wisconsin (Midwest Regional Semifinal)		Elliott	W 4–0	7,589	27–10–3
March 26	4:00 PM	vs. #8 Cornell*	#2	Resch Center • Green Bay, Wisconsin (Midwest Regional Final)		Elliott	W 1–0 ^{3OT}	8,086	28–10–3
April 6	7:07 PM	vs. #10 Maine*	#2	Bradley Center • Milwaukee, Wisconsin (National Semifinal)	ESPN2	Elliott	W 5–2	17,691	29–10–3
April 8	6:00 PM	vs. #9 Boston College*	#2	Bradley Center • Milwaukee, Wisconsin (National Championship)	ESPN	Elliott	W 2–1	17,758	30–10–3
*Non-conference game. ^{#}Rankings from USCHO.com Poll. All times are in Central Time. Source:

== National championship game ==
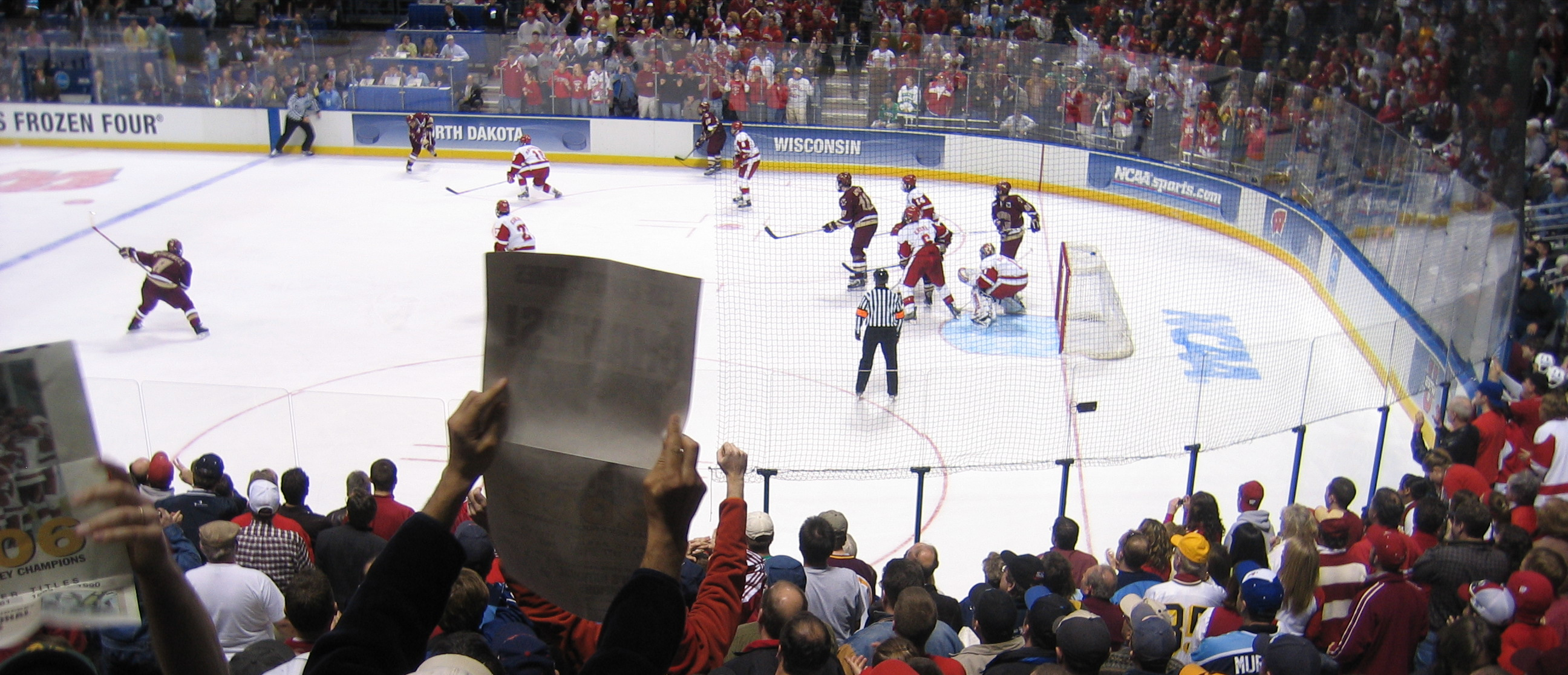
Championship game

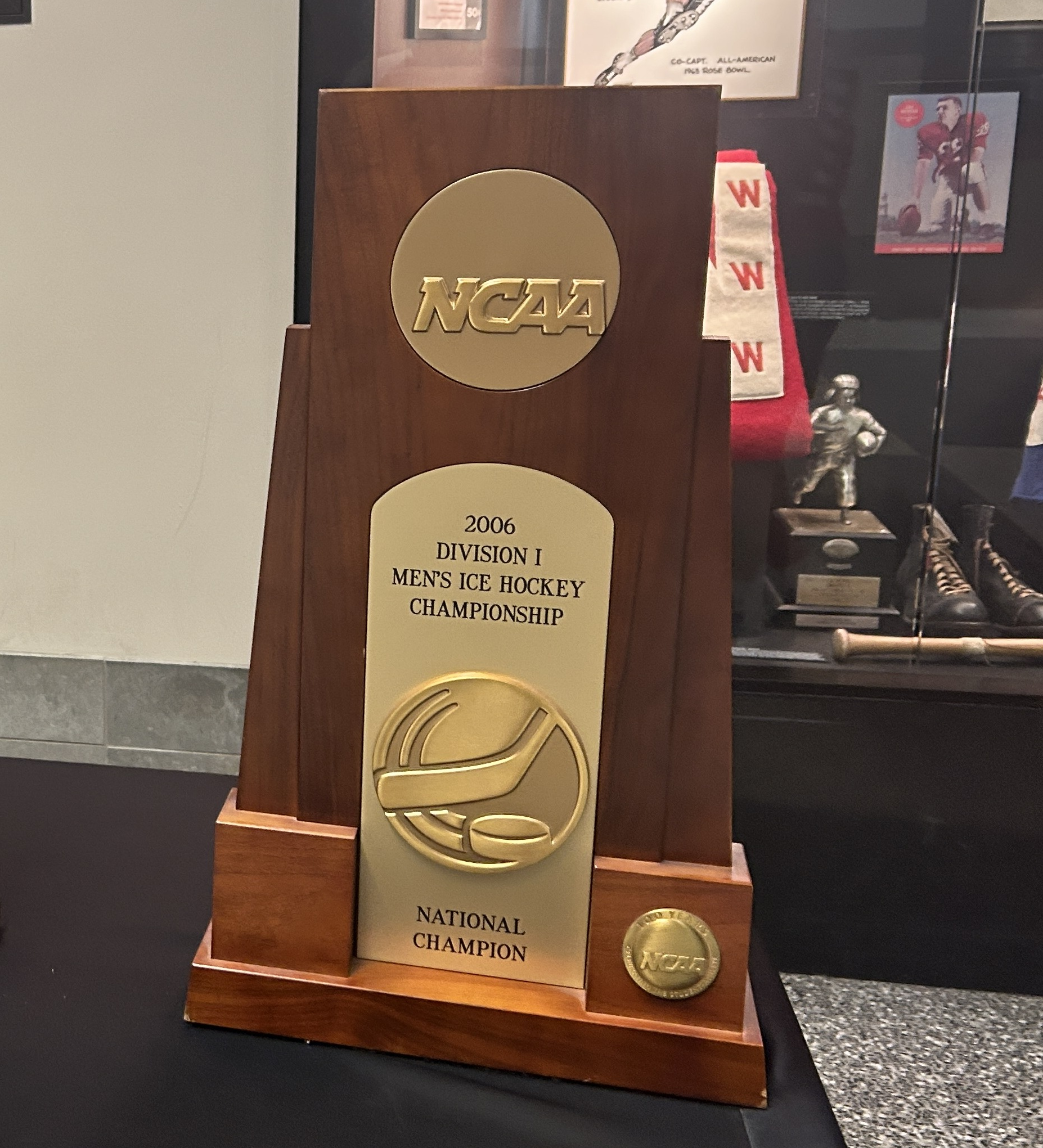
championship trophy

=== (MW1) Wisconsin vs. (NE3) Boston College ===
April 8	Wisconsin	2 – 1	Boston College	Bradley Center	Recap

Scoring summary
Period	Team	Goal	Assist(s)	Time	Score
1st	BC	Pat Gannon (5)	Bertram	09:01	1–0 BC
2nd	WIS	Robbie Earl (24)	Burish and Pavelski	21:17	1–1
3rd	WIS	Tom Gilbert (12) – GW PP	Pavelski and Burish	49:32	2–1 WIS
Penalty summary
Period	Team	Player	Penalty	Time	PIM
1st	BC	Anthony Aiello	Interference	03:22	2:00
1st	BC	Dan Bertram	Holding the Stick	05:57	2:00
1st	WIS	Matt Olinger	Interference	11:48	2:00
1st	BC	Dan Bertram	Contact to Head High-Sticking	13:36	2:00
1st	WIS	Tom Gilbert	Contact to Head High-Sticking	13:36	2:00
1st	BC	Dan Bertram	Hooking	18:03	2:00
2nd	BC	Joe Rooney	Hooking	22:38	2:00
2nd	BC	Nathan Gerbe	Roughing After The Whistle	25:03	2:00
2nd	WIS	Andy Brandt	Roughing After The Whistle	25:03	2:00
2nd	WIS	Jeff Likens	Contact to Head High-Sticking	26:30	2:00
3rd	WIS	Jake Dowell	Obstruction Cross-Checking	40:50	2:00
3rd	BC	Nathan Gerbe	Interference	42:44	2:00
3rd	WIS	Andy Brandt	Hooking	45:39	2:00
3rd	BC	Anthony Aiello	Hooking	48:34	2:00
3rd	BC	Tim Filangieri	Slashing	51:29	2:00
3rd	BC	Peter Harrold	Boarding	56:32	2:00

Shots by period
Team	1	2	3	T
Boston College	9	10	4	23
Wisconsin	17	11	11	39

Goaltenders
Team	Name	Saves	Goals against	Time on ice
BC	Cory Schneider	37	2	59:36
WIS	Brian Elliott	22	1	59:49

== Scoring statistics ==
Name	Position	Games	Goals	Assists	Points	PIM
Joe Pavelski	C/RW	43	23	33	56	34
Robbie Earl	C/LW	42	24	26	50	56
Adam Burish	LW/RW	42	9	24	33	67
Tom Gilbert	D	43	12	19	32	32
Ryan MacMurchy	RW	42	8	17	25	90
Ross Carlson	LW/RW	39	11	12	23	39
Jack Skille	LW/RW	41	13	8	21	37
Kyle Klubertanz	D	43	4	17	21	44
Jake Dowell	C	43	5	15	20	42
Andrew Joudrey	C	37	8	10	18	14
Jeff Likens	C	43	1	15	16	62
Ben Street	C/LW	43	10	5	15	0
Nick Licari	D	41	4	7	11	39
Joe Piskula	D	34	2	9	11	22
Matthew Ford	RW	31	5	2	7	14
A. J. Degenhardt	C	30	3	3	6	10
Davis Drewiske	D	37	2	2	4	24
Andy Brandt	RW	22	1	2	3	10
Josh Engel	D	17	0	3	3	6
Tom Gorowsky	F	18	0	2	2	8
Brian Elliott	G	35	0	1	1	2
Matt Olinger	D	42	0	1	1	67
Matt Auffrey	RW	1	0	0	0	0
Shane Connelly	G	9	0	0	0	0
Bench	-	-	-	-	-	6
Total			145	233	378	725

== Goaltending statistics ==
Name	Games	Minutes	Wins	Losses	Ties	Goals against	Saves	Shut outs	SV %	GAA
Brian Elliott	35	2128:08	27	5	3	55	837	8	.938	1.55
Shane Connelly	9	512:18	3	5	0	23	177	1	.885	2.69
Empty Net	-	7:24	-	-	-	1	-	-	-	-
Total	43	2647:50	30	10	3	79	1014	9	.928	1.79

== Rankings ==
Poll	Week																									
Poll	Pre	1	2	3	4	5	6	7	8	9	10	11	12	13	14	15	16	17	18	19	20	21	22	23	24	25 (Final)
USCHO.com	10 (1)	11	13	12	9	5	2 (7)	2 (8)	1 (39)	1 (40)	1 (24)	1 (33)	1 (37)	1 (40)	1 (40)	2 (11)	4 (3)	4 (3)	3 (5)	2 (2)	5	4	3 (1)	2 (15)	-	-
USA Today	10	11	13	12	10	5	2 (5)	2 (3)	1 (34)	1 (34)	1 (21)	1 (28)	1 (33)	1 (34)	1 (34)	2 (2)	4	4	3 (1)	2	6	4	4	2 (12)	1 (28)	1 (34)

Note: USCHO did not release a poll in weeks 24 or 25.

== Awards and honors ==
Player	Award	Ref
Robbie Earl	NCAA Tournament Most Outstanding Player	
Brian Elliott	AHCA West First Team All-American	
Tom Gilbert	AHCA West Second Team All-American	
Joe Pavelski	AHCA West Second Team All-American	
Tom Gilbert	All-WCHA First Team	
Brian Elliott	All-WCHA Second Team	
Joe Pavelski	All-WCHA Second Team	
Kyle Klubertanz	WCHA All-Tournament Team	
Brian Elliott	NCAA All-Tournament Team	
Tom Gilbert	NCAA All-Tournament Team	
Adam Burish	NCAA All-Tournament Team	
Robbie Earl	NCAA All-Tournament Team	

== Players drafted into the NHL ==
=== 2006 NHL entry draft ===
= NHL All-Star team	= NHL All-Star	= NHL All-Star and NHL All-Star team	= Did not play in the NHL

Round	Pick	Player	NHL team
2	51	Nigel Williams^{†}	Colorado Avalanche
2	56	Blake Geoffrion^{†}	Nashville Predators
2	63	Jamie McBain^{†}	Carolina Hurricanes
5	130	Brett Bennett^{†}	Phoenix Coyotes
7	192	Chris Hickey^{†}	Minnesota Wild

† incoming freshman
