= Adam Burish =

American ice hockey player (born 1983)

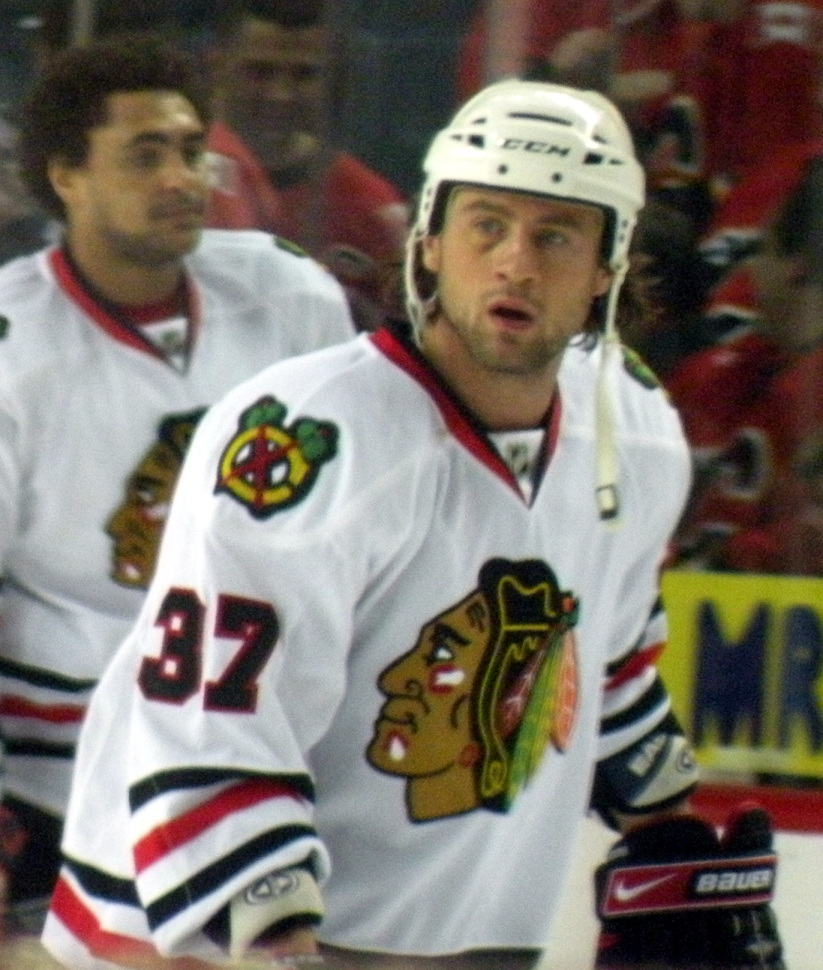
- Burish during his tenure with the Chicago Blackhawks in April 2009
- Born: January 6, 1983 (age 43) Madison, Wisconsin, U.S.
- Height: 6 ft 1 in (185 cm)
- Weight: 200 lb (91 kg; 14 st 4 lb)
- Position: Right wing
- Shot: Right
- Played for: Chicago Blackhawks; Dallas Stars; San Jose Sharks; Växjö Lakers; Malmö Redhawks
- National team: United States
- NHL draft: 282nd overall, 2002; Chicago Blackhawks
- Playing career: 2006–2016

Adam Mark Burish (born January 6, 1983) is an American former professional ice hockey winger who played in the National Hockey League (NHL) with the Chicago Blackhawks, Dallas Stars and San Jose Sharks. He is currently an analyst covering Blackhawks games on NBC Sports Chicago, however, the channel no longer exists.

== Playing career ==
Burish was drafted in the 9th round of the 2002 NHL entry draft, 282nd overall by the Chicago Blackhawks.

Prior to his NHL career Burish, a Madison, Wisconsin native, played at the University of Wisconsin and graduated with a degree in Economics. He served as captain for the national champion 2005–06 team, and assisted on both goals (by Robbie Earl and Tom Gilbert) in Wisconsin's 2-1 victory over Boston College in the title game.

He recorded his first career NHL goal on January 22, 2008.

Two seasons later, he won the Stanley Cup with the Chicago Blackhawks.

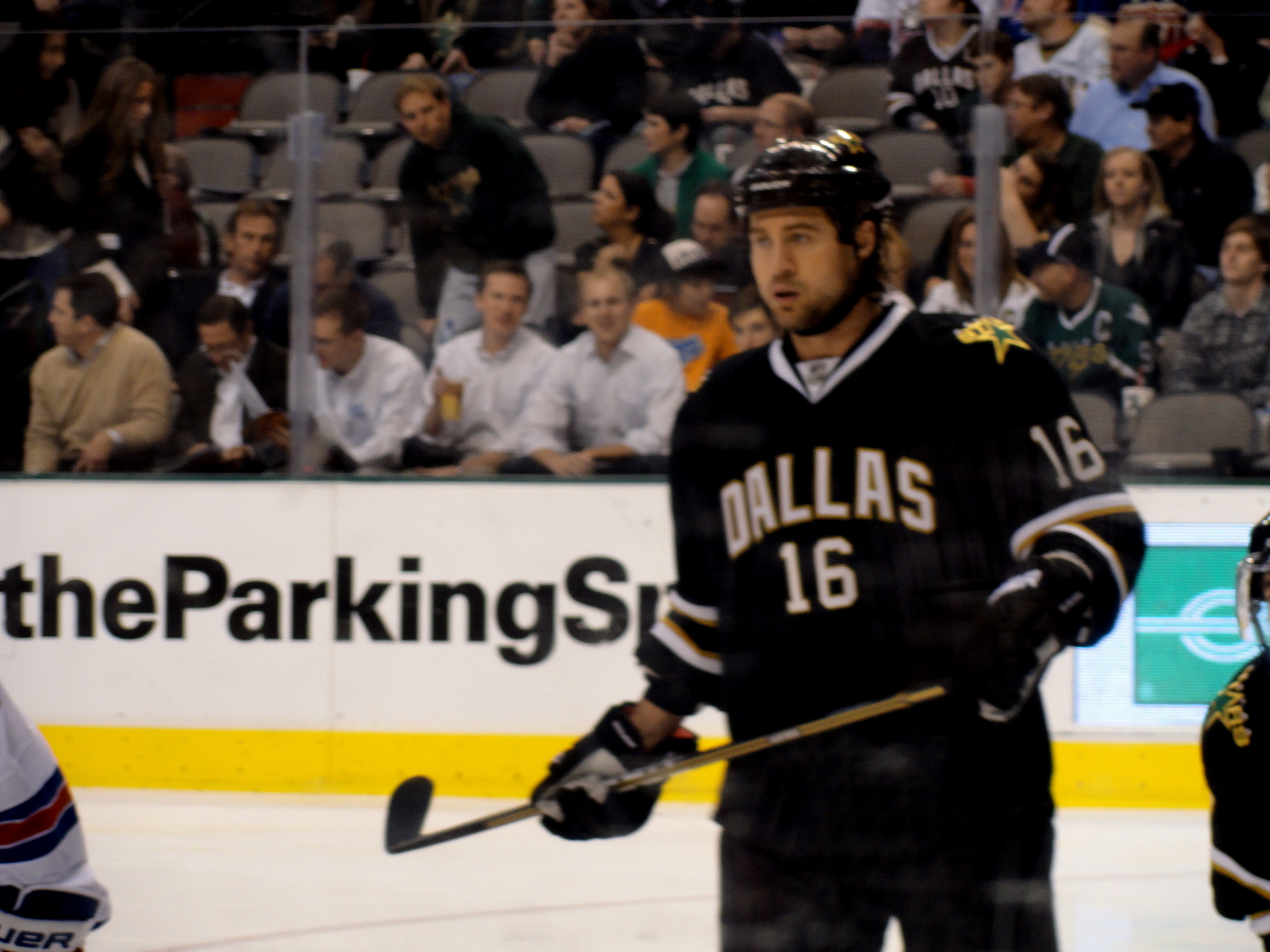
Burish with the Dallas Stars in January 2011

On July 1, 2010, Burish left the Blackhawks as a free agent and signed a two-year deal with the Dallas Stars at $1.15 million per year.

Upon expiration of his contract with the Stars, on July 1, 2012, Burish signed a four-year deal with the San Jose Sharks at $1.8 million per year, reuniting with University of Wisconsin teammate Joe Pavelski.

On October 17, 2013, Burish had surgery to repair an injured back and was placed on Injured Reserve.

In the 2014–15 season, on November 21, 2014, Burish was placed on waivers by the Sharks and was sent down to play with affiliate, the Worcester Sharks of the AHL. On January 14, 2015, the Chicago Wolves acquired Burish via loan. After concluding the season with the Wolves, on June 19, 2015, Burish was bought out from the final year of his contract with the Sharks, releasing him to free agency.

Unable to gain another NHL deal, Burish left North America as a free agent, signing his first contract abroad for the 2015–16 season, in playing with the Växjö Lakers and Malmö Redhawks of the Swedish Hockey League (SHL). He left the Redhawks in 2016 after playing in 3 games.

== Media career ==
Burish joined NBC Sports Chicago in 2017 as an analyst for the Chicago Blackhawks. He provides commentary during pregame and postgame shows.

== Personal ==
Burish has a younger sister, Nikki Burish, who also played for the University of Wisconsin. Both siblings won their national championship the same year, 2006.

Married to Jackie Burish on August 17, 2019.

Burish attended the Route 91 Harvest music festival on October 1, 2017, when a gunman opened fire on concertgoers. He survived the attack and was not injured.

== Career statistics ==
=== Regular season and playoffs ===
			Regular season					Playoffs
Season	Team	League	GP	G	A	Pts	PIM	GP	G	A	Pts	PIM
2000–01	Edgewood High School	HS-WI	22	25	30	55	22	—	—	—	—	—
2001–02	Green Bay Gamblers	USHL	61	24	33	57	122	1	0	0	0	0
2002–03	University of Wisconsin	WCHA	19	0	6	6	32	—	—	—	—	—
2003–04	University of Wisconsin	WCHA	43	6	13	19	63	—	—	—	—	—
2004–05	University of Wisconsin	WCHA	41	13	7	20	41	—	—	—	—	—
2005–06	University of Wisconsin	WCHA	40	8	21	29	67	—	—	—	—	—
2006–07	Norfolk Admirals	AHL	64	11	10	21	146	6	1	1	2	4
2006–07	Chicago Blackhawks	NHL	9	0	0	0	2	—	—	—	—	—
2007–08	Chicago Blackhawks	NHL	81	4	4	8	214	—	—	—	—	—
2008–09	Chicago Blackhawks	NHL	66	6	3	9	93	17	3	2	5	30
2009–10	Chicago Blackhawks	NHL	13	1	3	4	14	15	0	0	0	2
2010–11	Dallas Stars	NHL	63	8	6	14	91	—	—	—	—	—
2011–12	Dallas Stars	NHL	65	6	13	19	76	—	—	—	—	—
2012–13	San Jose Sharks	NHL	46	1	2	3	25	6	0	0	0	4
2013–14	San Jose Sharks	NHL	15	0	0	0	6	—	—	—	—	—
2014–15	San Jose Sharks	NHL	20	1	2	3	33	—	—	—	—	—
2014–15	Worcester Sharks	AHL	18	4	3	7	14	—	—	—	—	—
2014–15	Chicago Wolves	AHL	36	6	6	12	18	5	0	1	1	4
2015–16	Växjö Lakers	SHL	19	1	5	6	12	—	—	—	—	—
2015–16	Malmö Redhawks	SHL	3	0	1	1	2	—	—	—	—	—
AHL totals			118	21	19	40	178	9	1	2	3	8
NHL totals			378	27	33	60	554	38	3	2	5	36
SHL totals			22	1	6	7	14	—	—	—	—	—

=== International ===
Year	Team	Event	Result	GP	G	A	Pts	PIM
2008	United States	WC	6th	7	0	3	3	27
Senior totals				7	0	3	3	27

== Awards and honors ==
Awards	Year
College
All-NCAA All-Tournament Team	2006
NHL
Stanley Cup (Chicago Blackhawks)	2010
