= 2006 NCAA Division I men's ice hockey tournament =

- 2006 Frozen Four logo
- Teams: 16
- Finals site: Bradley Center, Milwaukee
- Champions: Wisconsin Badgers (6th title)
- Runner-up: Boston College Eagles (7th title game)
- Semifinalists: North Dakota Fighting Sioux (16th Frozen Four); Maine Black Bears (10th Frozen Four)
- Winning coach: Mike Eaves (1st title)
- MOP: Robbie Earl (Wisconsin)
- Attendance: 117,613

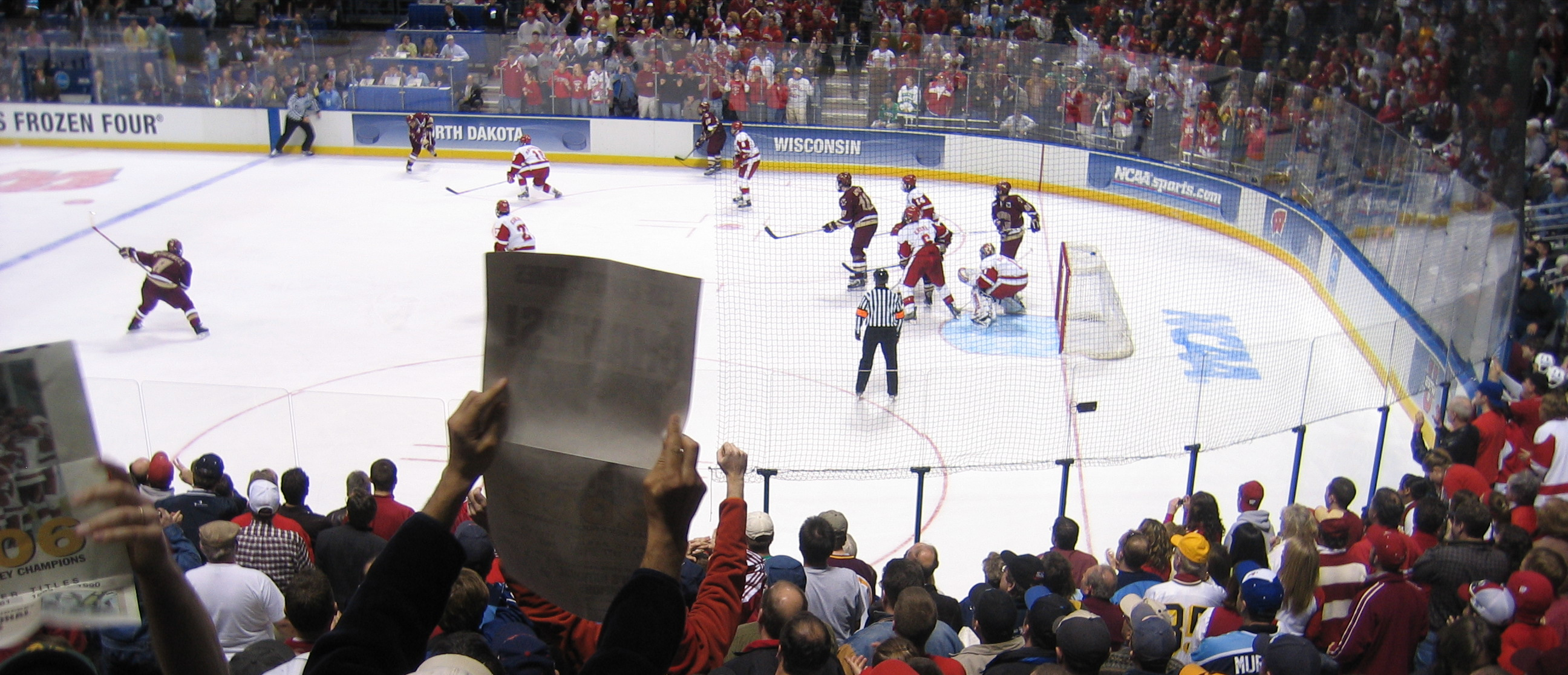
Final moments of play of the National Championship game

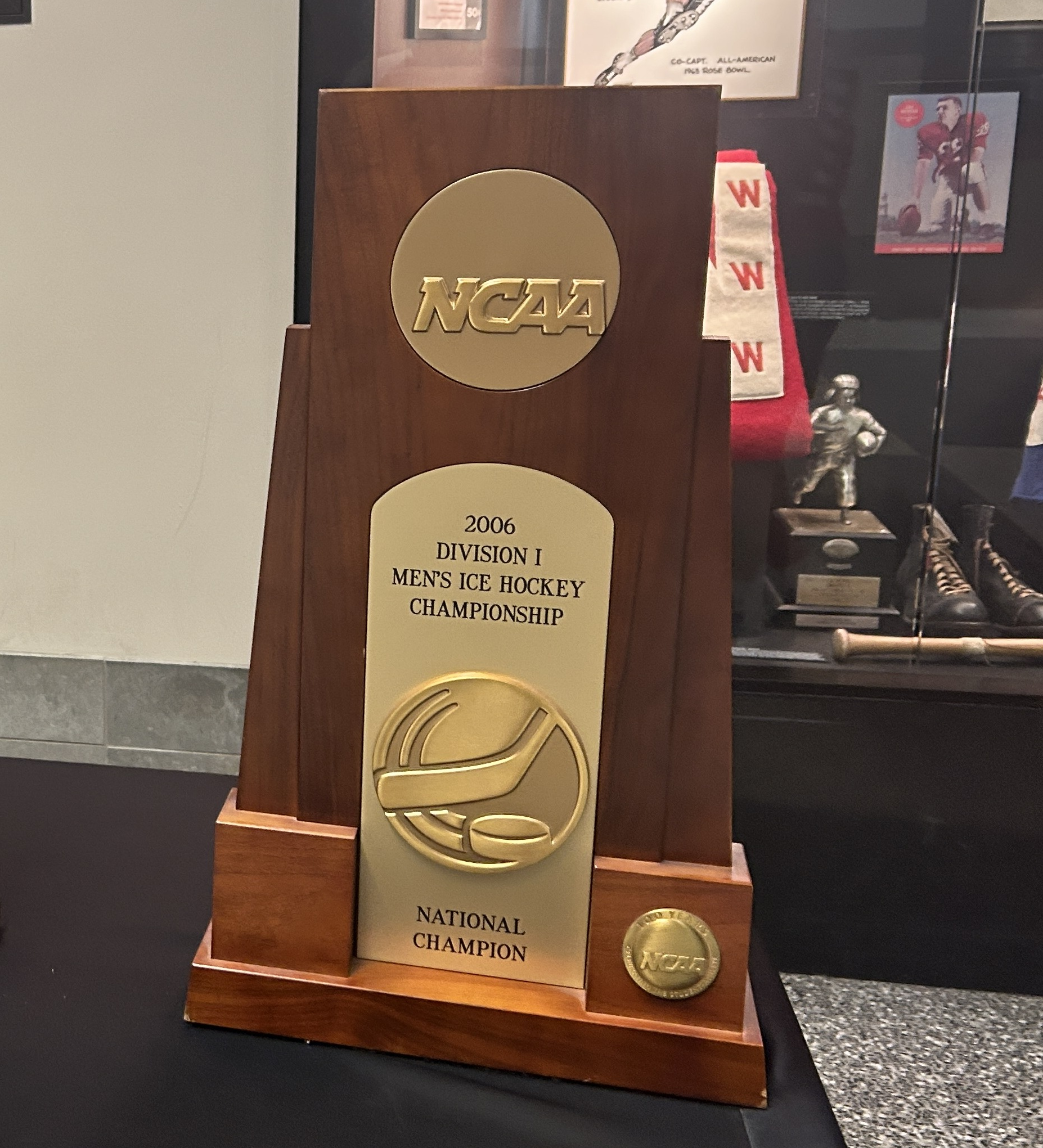
trophy received by Wisconsin

The 2006 NCAA Division I men's ice hockey tournament involved 16 schools playing in single-elimination play to determine the national champion of men's NCAA Division I college ice hockey. It began on March 24, 2006, and ended with the championship game on April 8. A total of 15 games were played.

With Wisconsin’s 2-1 win over Boston College, the University of Wisconsin became the first school to win both the men’s and women’s Division I hockey title in the same year, with Wisconsin defeating Minnesota 2-0 in the 2006 women’s tournament.

The tournament is also largely remembered for a 4–3 overtime win by Holy Cross over Minnesota, which is typically considered one of the biggest upsets in NCAA Division 1 Men's Ice Hockey tournament history.

== Game locations ==
2006 Regionals (blue) and Frozen Four (red)

The NCAA Men's Division I Ice Hockey Championship is a single-elimination tournament featuring 16 teams representing all six Division I conferences in the nation. The Championship Committee seeds the entire field from 1 to 16 within four regionals of 4 teams. The winners of the six Division I conference championships receive automatic bids to participate in the NCAA Championship. Regional placements are based primarily on the home location of the top seed in each bracket with an attempt made to put the top-ranked teams close to their home site.

=== Regional Sites ===
- East – Pepsi Arena, Albany, New York — Host: Rensselaer Polytechnic Institute and the ECAC Hockey League
- Midwest – Resch Center, Green Bay, Wisconsin — Host: Michigan Technological University
- Northeast – DCU Center, Worcester, Massachusetts — Host: Boston University
- West – Ralph Engelstad Arena, Grand Forks, North Dakota — Host: University of North Dakota

=== Frozen Four ===
- Bradley Center, Milwaukee, Wisconsin — Host: University of Wisconsin–Madison

== Qualifying teams ==
The at-large bids and seeding for each team in the tournament was announced on March 19, 2006. The Central Collegiate Hockey Association (CCHA), Hockey East and the Western Collegiate Hockey Association (WCHA) each had four teams receive a berth in the tournament, the ECACHL had two teams receive a berth in the tournament, while Atlantic Hockey and College Hockey America (CHA) both received a single bid for their tournament champions.

Midwest Regional – Green Bay							West Regional – Grand Forks						
Seed	School	Conference	Record	Berth type	Appearance	Last bid	Seed	School	Conference	Record	Berth type	Appearance	Last bid
1	Wisconsin (1)	WCHA	26–10–3	At-large bid	22nd	2005	1	Minnesota (2)	WCHA	27–8–5	At-large bid	30th	2005
2	Cornell	ECACHL	21–8–4	At-large bid	16th	2005	2	North Dakota	WCHA	27–15–1	Tournament champion	21st	2005
3	Colorado College	WCHA	24–15–2	At-large bid	18th	2005	3	Michigan	CCHA	21–14–5	At-large bid	29th	2005
4	Bemidji State	CHA	20–13–3	Tournament champion	2nd	2005	4	Holy Cross	Atlantic Hockey	26–9–2	Tournament champion	2nd	2004
Northeast Regional – Worcester							East Regional – Albany						
Seed	School	Conference	Record	Berth type	Appearance	Last bid	Seed	School	Conference	Record	Berth type	Appearance	Last bid
1	Boston University (3)	Hockey East	25–9–4	Tournament champion	29th	2005	1	Michigan State (4)	CCHA	24–11–8	Tournament champion	24th	2005
2	Miami	CCHA	26–8–4	At-large bid	4th	2004	2	Harvard	ECACHL	21–11–2	Tournament champion	21st	2005
3	Boston College	Hockey East	23–12–3	At-large bid	26th	2005	3	Maine	Hockey East	26–11–2	At-large bid	16th	2005
4	Nebraska-Omaha	CCHA	20–14–6	At-large bid	1st	Never	4	New Hampshire	Hockey East	20–12–7	At-large bid	16th	2005

Number in parentheses denotes overall seed in the tournament.

== Bracket ==
Regional Semifinals; March 24–25
1	Wisconsin (1)	4
4	Bemidji State	0
Midwest – Green Bay – Sat/Sun
2	Cornell	3
3	Colorado College	2
1	Michigan State (4)	1
4	New Hampshire	0
East – Albany – Sat/Sun
2	Harvard	1
3	Maine	6
1	Minnesota (2)	3
4	Holy Cross	4*
West – Grand Forks – Fri/Sat
2	North Dakota	5
3	Michigan	1
1	Boston University (3)	9
4	Nebraska–Omaha	2
Northeast – Worcester – Fri/Sat
2	Miami	0
3	Boston College	5

Regional Finals; March 25–26
1	Wisconsin (1)	1***
2	Cornell	0
1	Michigan State (4)	4
3	Maine	5
4	Holy Cross	2
2	North Dakota	5
1	Boston University (3)	0
3	Boston College	5

National Semifinals; April 6
MW1	Wisconsin (1)	5
E3	Maine	2
W2	North Dakota	5
NE3	Boston College	6

National Championship; April 8
MW1	Wisconsin (1)	2
NE3	Boston College	1

Number in parentheses denotes overall seed in the tournament
Note: * denotes overtime period(s)

== Results ==
=== Midwest Regional – Green Bay, Wisconsin ===
==== Regional Semifinals ====
March 25, 2006; 1:30 pm	(1) Wisconsin	4–0 (1–0, 2–0, 1–0)	(4) Bemidji State	Resch Center; Attendance: 7,859

Game reference

Brian Elliott
Goalies
Layne Sedevie
Referee:
Matt Shegos
Linesmen:
Kevin Langseth
Keith Sergott

(Joudrey, Burish) Joe Pavelski – GW PP – 17:07	1 – 0
(unassisted) Joe Pavelski – 20:26	2 – 0
(Burish) Jake Dowell – 37:30	3 – 0
(Gilbert, Joudrey) Joe Pavelski – PP – 46:38	4 – 0

21 min
Penalties
16 min
45
Shots
15

March 25, 2006; 5:00 pm	(2) Cornell	3–2 (0–2, 1–0, 2–0)	(3) Colorado College	Resch Center; Attendance: 7,859

Game reference

David McKee
Goalies
Matt Zaba
Referee:
Scott Hansen
Linesmen:
Tom Fyrer
Tom Quinn

	0 – 1	04:57 – PP – Brian Salcido (Sertich, McCulloch)
	0 – 2	16:49 – PP – Jack Hillen (Sertich, Sterling)
(Moulson, Seminoff) Topher Scott – PP – 36:44	1 – 2
(Carefoot) Matt Moulson – 44:50	2 – 2
(Sawada, Abbott) Jon Gleed – GW – 49:20	3 – 2

6 min
Penalties
8 min
23
Shots
22

==== Regional Final ====
March 26, 2006; 4:00 pm	(1) Wisconsin	1–0 (3OT) (0–0, 0–0, 0–0, 0–0, 0–0, 1–0)	(2) Cornell	Resch Center; Attendance: 8,086

Game reference
Brian Elliott	Goalies	David McKee	Referee: Matt Shegos; Linesmen: Keith Sergott; Kevin Langseth
(Engel) Jack Skille – GW – 111:13 / 1 – 0			Referee: Matt Shegos; Linesmen: Keith Sergott; Kevin Langseth
6 min	Penalties	14 min	Referee: Matt Shegos; Linesmen: Keith Sergott; Kevin Langseth
60	Shots	40	Referee: Matt Shegos; Linesmen: Keith Sergott; Kevin Langseth

=== West Regional – Grand Forks, North Dakota ===
==== Regional Semifinals ====
March 24, 2006; 5:30 pm	(1) Minnesota	3–4 (OT) (0–0, 2–2, 1–1, 0–1)	(4) Holy Cross	Ralph Engelstad Arena; Attendance: 11,153

Game reference

Kellen Briggs
Goalies
Tony Quesada
Referee:
Tim Benedetto
Linesmen:
Tim Low
Bob Bernard

	0 – 1	28:49 – Dale Reinhardt (Bartlett, McGregor)
(Guyer) Mike Howe – SH – 33:15	1 – 1
	1 – 2	33:46 – PP – Tyler McGregor (Sixsmith, Landry)
(Kaufmann, Harrington) Phil Kessel – 35:45	2 – 2
(Wheeler) Alex Goligoski – 42:17	3 – 2
	3 – 3	47:53 – Pierre Napert-Frenette (Nappo, Landry)
	3 – 4	60:53 – GW – Tyler McGregor (Burke)

22 min
Penalties
16 min
38
Shots
28

March 24, 2006; 9:00 pm	(2) North Dakota	5–1 (2–0, 2–1, 1–0)	(3) Michigan	Ralph Engelstad Arena; Attendance: 11,153

Game reference

Jordan Parise
Goalies
Noah Ruden
Referee:
Dave Hansen
Linesmen:
Scott Whittemore
Joe Ross

(Toews, Radke) Ryan Duncan – PP – 05:01	1 – 0
(Špirko, Lee) T. J. Oshie – GW PP – 07:28	2 – 0
(Zajac) Drew Stafford – SH – 24:08	3 – 0
	3 – 1	24:30 – PP – Chad Kolarik (Kaleniecki, Hunwick)
(Duncan) Jonathan Toews – 34:39	4 – 1
(Oshie) Travis Zajac – 54:42	5 – 1

18 min
Penalties
14 min
33
Shots
35

==== Regional Final ====
March 25, 2006; 8:00 pm	(2) North Dakota	5–2 (2–0, 1–1, 2–1)	(4) Holy Cross	Ralph Engelstad Arena; Attendance: 11,492

Game reference

Jordan Parise
Goalies
Tony Quesada
Referee:
Dave Hansen
Linesmen:
Scott Whittemore
Joe Ross

(Duncan, Radke) Jonathan Toews – 01:18	1 – 0
(Toews, Smaby) Ryan Duncan – PP – 15:16	2 – 0
	2 – 1	23:07 – Matt Werry (Tselikis)
(Stafford, Duncan) Matt Smaby – GW PP – 37:23	3 – 1
	3 – 2	45:21 – PP – Blair Bartlett (McGregor, Reinhardt)
(Lee, Oshie) Travis Zajac – PP – 46:48	4 – 2
(Porter) Matt Watkins – 49:03	5 – 2

10 min
Penalties
10 min
32
Shots
19

=== Northeast Regional – Worcester, Massachusetts ===
==== Regional Semifinals ====
March 24, 2006; 4:00 pm	(1) Boston University	9–2 (1–1, 6–1, 2–0)	(4) Nebraska-Omaha	DCU Center

Game reference

(out 53:13) John Curry
(in 53:13) Stephan Siwiec
Goalies
Jerad Kaufmann (out 53:13)
Eric Aarnio (in 53:13)
Referee:
John Campion
Linesmen:
Ed Moberg
Scott Staudte

	0 – 1	03:32 – Bill Thomas (Betts, Krischuk)
(Sullivan, MacArthur) Bryan Ewing – PP – 18:24	1 – 1
(Lawrence, Yip) Chris Higgins – 24:53	2 – 1
(Laliberte, Van der Gulik) Dan Spang – GW – 27:52	3 – 1
	3 – 2	28:06 – Tomas Klempa (Charleston, Platisha)
(Lawrence, Yip) Chris Higgins – 28:38	4 – 2
(Ewing, MacArthur) Kenny Roche – 28:59	5 – 2
(Sullivan) Chris Higgins – 30:24	6 – 2
(Roche, Yip) Bryan Ewing – PP – 37:17	7 – 2
(Morrow, Redlihs) Ryan Weston – PP – 48:04	8 – 2
(Sullivan, Weston) Brian McGuirk – PP – 53:13	9 – 2

6 min
Penalties
25 min
38
Shots
22

March 24, 2006; 7:15 pm	(2) Miami	0–5 (0–0, 0–3, 0–2)	(3) Boston College	DCU Center; Attendance: 7,663

Game reference

Charlie Effinger
Goalies
Cory Schneider
Referee:
Peter Feola
Linesmen:
Derek Wahl
Andy O'Brien

0 – 1	20:34 – GW PP – Benn Ferriero (Collins, Harrold)
0 – 2	23:14 – PP – Benn Ferriero (Boyle, Motherwell)
0 – 3	38:35 – Dan Bertram (Gionta)
0 – 4	53:00 – EN – Chris Collins (unassisted)
0 – 5	59:32 – EN – Mike Brennan (unassisted)

20 min
Penalties
24 min
33
Shots
31

==== Regional Final ====
March 25, 2006; 6:00 pm	(1) Boston University	0–5 (0–1, 0–3, 0–1)	(3) Boston College	DCU Center; Attendance: 8,742

Game reference

John Curry
Goalies
Cory Schneider
Referee:
John Campion
Linesmen:
Ed Moberg
Scott Staudte

0 – 1	06:24 – GW – Brian Boyle (unassisted)
0 – 2	24:40 – Matt Greene (Rooney, Gionta)
0 – 3	33:22 – SH – Joe Rooney (Ferriero, Boyle)
0 – 4	36:00 – SH – Joe Rooney (Gionta)
0 – 5	54:26 – Benn Ferriero (Rooney, Motherwell)

22 min
Penalties
20 min
28
Shots
31

=== East Regional – Albany, New York ===
==== Regional Semifinals ====
March 25, 2006; 12:00 pm	(1) Michigan State	1–0 (1–0, 0–0, 0–0)	(4) New Hampshire	Pepsi Arena

Game reference
Jeff Lerg	Goalies	Jeff Pietrasiak	Referee: Derek Shepherd; Linesmen: Kyle Bergen; Nathan Freeman
(Kennedy, Abdelkader) Tim Crowder – GW – 02:14 / 1 – 0			Referee: Derek Shepherd; Linesmen: Kyle Bergen; Nathan Freeman
8 min	Penalties	12 min	Referee: Derek Shepherd; Linesmen: Kyle Bergen; Nathan Freeman
30	Shots	36	Referee: Derek Shepherd; Linesmen: Kyle Bergen; Nathan Freeman

March 25, 2006; 3:00 pm	(2) Harvard	1–6 (1–2, 0–2, 0–2)	(3) Maine	Pepsi Arena; Attendance: 5,062

Game reference

John Dagineau
Goalies
Ben Bishop
Referee:
Steve Piotrowski
Linesmen:
Brian Hill
Paul Tunison

	0 – 1	08:16 – Josh Soares (Léveillé)
(Coskren, Johnson) Mike Taylor – 09:32	1 – 1
	1 – 2	09:57 – GW – Bret Tyler (unassisted)
	1 – 3	27:49 – John Hopson (Hahn, Hopson)
	1 – 4	32:01 – Michel Léveillé (unassisted)
	1 – 5	56:24 – EN – Greg Moore (Léveillé)
	1 – 6	59:20 – PP – Brent Shepheard (Bellamy)

16 min
Penalties
10 min
26
Shots
44

==== Regional Final ====
March 26, 2006; 2:00 pm	(1) Michigan State	4–5 (1–3, 2–1, 1–1)	(3) Maine	Pepsi Arena; Attendance: 4,470

Game reference

Jeff Lerg
Goalies
Ben Bishop
Referee:
Derek Shepherd
Linesmen:
Kyle Bergen
Nathan Freeman

	0 – 1	03:13 – Matt Duffy (Damon)
	0 – 2	10:21 – John Hopson (Hamilton, Hopson)
	0 – 3	16:38 – PP – John Hopson (Duffy, Hopson)
(Booth, Kennedy) Tim Crowder – PP – 19:16	1 – 3
	1 – 4	23:35 – PP – Derek Damon (Soares, Lundin)
(Kennedy, Booth) Tim Crowder – PP – 28:00	2 – 4
(Lerg, Mueller) Jim McKenzie – 39:00	3 – 4
	3 – 5	59:23 – GW EN – Greg Moore (Soares)
(unassisted) Drew Miller – 59:55	4 – 5

10 min
Penalties
14 min
37
Shots
34

=== Frozen Four – Milwaukee, Wisconsin ===
==== National Semifinals ====
April 6, 2006; 2:00 pm	(W2) North Dakota	5–6 (0–3, 2–2, 3–1)	(NE3) Boston College	Bradley Center; Attendance: 17,637

Game reference

Jordan Parise
Goalies
Cory Schneider
Referee:
Steve Piotrowski
Linesmen:
Paul Tunison
Brian Hill

	0 – 1	07:43 – Brett Motherwell (Orpik, Gannon)
	0 – 2	12:34 – SH – Chris Collins (Brennan)
	0 – 3	18:08 – Chris Collins (Bradford)
(Zajac) Rastislav Špirko – SH – 24:23	1 – 3
(Watkins, Porter) Rylan Kaip – 33:25	2 – 3
	2 – 4	35:38 – Anthony Aiello (unassisted)
	2 – 5	39:37 – PP – Chris Collins (Ferriero, Schneider)
(unassisted) Jonathan Toews – PP – 48:11	3 – 5
	3 – 6	50:33 – GW – Nathan Gerbe (Filangieri)
(Stafford, Lee) Travis Zajac – SH – 55:42	4 – 6
(Zajac) Brian Lee – EA – 59:47	5 – 6

18 min
Penalties
22 min
41
Shots
31

April 6, 2006; 7:00 pm	(MW1) Wisconsin	5–2 (1–1, 2–0, 2–1)	(E3) Maine	Bradley Center; Attendance: 17,691

Game reference

Brian Elliott
Goalies
Ben Bishop
Referee:
Dave Hansen
Linesmen:
Joe Ross
Andy O'Brien

(Paveksli, Earl) Adam Burish – 10:11	1 – 0
	1 – 1	17:37 – Michel Léveillé (Duffy)
(unassisted) Ross Carlson – SH – 24:18	2 – 1
(Burish) Robbie Earl – GW PP – 28:16	3 – 1
	3 – 2	51:29 – Mike Lundin (Moore, Soares)
(Carlson, Skille) Ben Street – 52:26	4 – 2
(Engel) Robbie Earl – EN – 58:16	5 – 2

16 min
Penalties
16 min
39
Shots
34

==== National Championship ====
April 8, 2006; 6:00 pm	(MW1) Wisconsin	2–1 (0–1, 1–0, 1–0)	(NE3) Boston College	Bradley Center; Attendance: 17,758

Game reference
Referee: Matt Shegos; Linesmen: Kevin Langseth; Keith Sergott

Scoring summary
Period	Team	Goal	Assist(s)	Time	Score
1st	BC	Pat Gannon (5)	Bertram	09:01	1–0 BC
2nd	WIS	Robbie Earl (24)	Burish and Pavelski	21:17	1–1
3rd	WIS	Tom Gilbert (12) – GW PP	Pavelski and Burish	49:32	2–1 WIS
Penalty summary
Period	Team	Player	Penalty	Time	PIM
1st	BC	Anthony Aiello	Interference	03:22	2:00
1st	BC	Dan Bertram	Holding the stick	05:57	2:00
1st	WIS	Matt Olinger	Interference	11:48	2:00
1st	BC	Dan Bertram	Contact to head – High-sticking	13:36	2:00
1st	WIS	Tom Gilbert	Contact to head – High-sticking	13:36	2:00
1st	BC	Dan Bertram	Hooking	18:03	2:00
2nd	BC	Joe Rooney	Hooking	22:38	2:00
2nd	BC	Nathan Gerbe	Roughing after the whistle	25:03	2:00
2nd	WIS	Andy Brandt	Roughing after the whistle	25:03	2:00
2nd	WIS	Jeff Likens	Contact to head – High-sticking	26:30	2:00
3rd	WIS	Jake Dowell	Obstruction – Cross-checking	40:50	2:00
3rd	BC	Nathan Gerbe	Interference	42:44	2:00
3rd	WIS	Andy Brandt	Hooking	45:39	2:00
3rd	BC	Anthony Aiello	Hooking	48:34	2:00
3rd	BC	Tim Filangieri	Slashing	51:29	2:00
3rd	BC	Peter Harrold	Boarding	56:32	2:00

Shots by period
Team	1	2	3	T
Boston College	9	10	4	23
Wisconsin	17	11	11	39

Goaltenders
Team	Name	Saves	Goals against	Time on ice
BC	Cory Schneider	37	2	59:36
WIS	Brian Elliott	22	1	59:49

== All-Tournament team ==
- G: Brian Elliott (Wisconsin)
- D: Tom Gilbert (Wisconsin)
- D: Brett Motherwell (Boston College)
- F: Adam Burish (Wisconsin)
- F: Chris Collins (Boston College)
- F: Robbie Earl* (Wisconsin)

* Most Outstanding Player(s)

== Record by conference ==
Conference	# of Bids	Record	Win %	Regional Finals	Frozen Four	Championship Game	Champions
WCHA	4	6–3	.667	2	2	1	1
Hockey East	4	6–4	.600	3	2	1	-
CCHA	4	1–4	.200	1	-	-	-
ECACHL	2	1–2	.333	1	-	-	-
Atlantic Hockey	1	1-1	.500	1	-	-	-
CHA	1	0–1	.000	-	-	-	-
