= Kevin Regan =

American ice hockey player (born 1984)

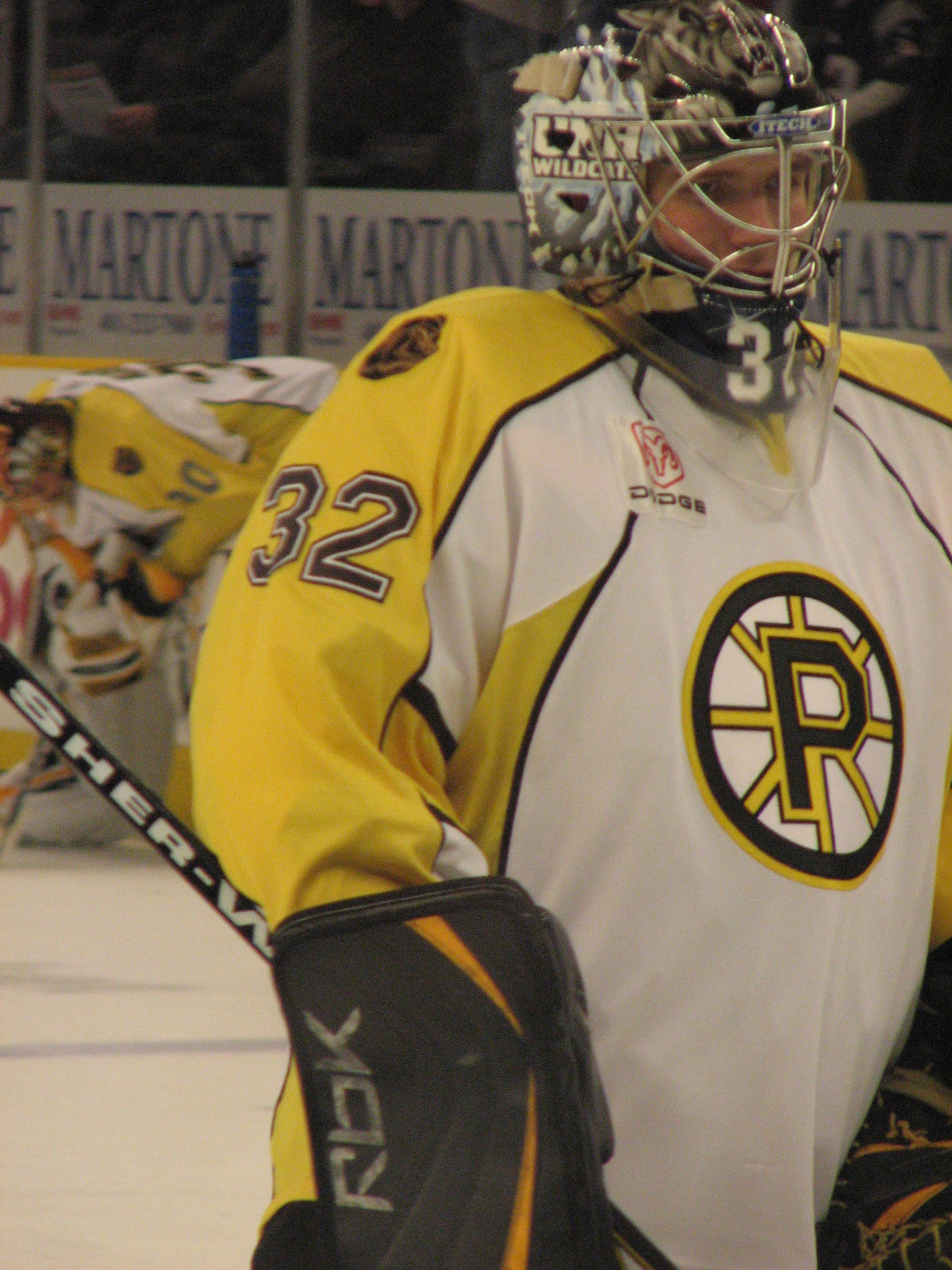
- Born: July 25, 1984 (age 41) South Boston, Massachusetts, U.S.
- Height: 6 ft 1 in (185 cm)
- Weight: 190 lb (86 kg; 13 st 8 lb)
- Position: Goaltender
- Shot: Left
- Played for: Providence Bruins
- NHL draft: 277th overall, 2003; Boston Bruins
- Playing career: 2007–2015

Kevin Regan (born July 25, 1984) is an American former professional ice hockey goaltender. He played college ice hockey for the New Hampshire Wildcats, and once held the all-time leader in save percentage in Hockey East conference games.

== Playing career ==
Born in South Boston, Massachusetts, Regan attended Saint Sebastian's School in Needham, Massachusetts. He began his career playing for the Waterloo Black Hawks of the USHL for the 2003–04 season. While playing in Waterloo he was one of the most successful goaltenders that the team has seen, setting team records for single season wins and shutouts. That year the Black Hawks reached the Clark Cup finals and Regan was named the Clark Cup MVP. A lifelong Boston Bruins fan, he was drafted by the Bruins in the ninth round (277 overall) of the 2003 NHL entry draft.

He then attended the University of New Hampshire from 2004 until 2008. In 2005 and 2007 UNH twice reached the Hockey East Championship game, only to lose to Boston College each time. They also advanced to the NCAA tournament each of the four seasons that Regan played. He received several awards his senior season and was a finalist for the Hobey Baker Award. He was a unanimous selection as the 2008 Hockey East Player of the Year and also won the Walter Brown Award for best American college hockey player in New England. In addition he was the All-Hockey East First Team goaltender and won Hockey East Defensive Player of the Week seven times. He also set the UNH record for single season save percentage and was the first UNH goaltender to win twenty games in two consecutive seasons. He graduated from UNH with a dual major in Finance and Economics. His high GPA earned him a spot on the Hockey East's All-Academic Team.

After graduating, he spent the 2008–09 and 2009–10 seasons in the American Hockey League and the ECHL. He was signed by the Providence Bruins in 2008, where he initially served as a backup to Tuukka Rask. While in the AHL he was hampered by hip injuries, including a torn labrum, that required multiple surgeries. He was briefly called up to the Boston Bruins in January 2009 but did not see any action. After recovering from his injuries he moved to Italy in 2010 to play for Hockey Club Valpellice of Serie A. At Valpellice he had eight teammates from North America. Following a return in 2012 to the United States with the Wichita Thunder in the CHL for one season, Regan returned to Europe, playing two seasons for the Fife Flyers, the continent's oldest hockey club. Heralded among the best all-time Fife Flyer keepers, Kevin Regan retired after the 2015 campaign.

== Career statistics ==
Season	Team	League	GP	W	L	T/OTL	MIN	GA	SO	GAA	SV%
2003–04	Waterloo Black Hawks	USHL	50	28	19	1	2,809	111	6	2.37	.915
2004–05	University of New Hampshire	HE	23	15	4	2	1,276	50	0	2.35	.928
2005–06	University of New Hampshire	HE	22	8	8	5	1,299	57	3	2.63	.914
2006–07	University of New Hampshire	HE	35	24	9	2	2,066	71	3	2.06	.935
2007–08	University of New Hampshire	HE	32	23	8	1	1,958	72	3	2.21	.930
2007–08	Providence Bruins	AHL	1	1	0	0	60	0	1	0	1.00
2008–09	Providence Bruins	AHL	21	9	7	2	1,124	56	0	2.99	.896
2008–09	Gwinnett Gladiators	ECHL	1	1	1	0	120	5	0	2.50	.904
2008–09	Alaska Aces	ECHL	4	2	2	0	243	10	0	2.47	.924
2009–10	Reading Royals	ECHL	6	2	2	2	367	23	0	3.76	.896
2009–10	Providence Bruins	AHL	21	8	11	0	1,159	49	0	2.54	.915
2010-11	HC Valpellice	Serie A	39	18	21	0	2,222	125	0	3.38	.914
2011–12	HC Valpellice	Serie A	8	3	4	0	467	25	0	3.21	.917
2012–13	Wichita Thunder	CHL	27	13	10	3	1,570	27	2	2.41	.908
2013–14	Fife Flyers	EIHL	48	23	23	2	2,867	158	0	3.31	.897
2014–15	Fife Flyers	EIHL	51	22	27	2	3,012	160	3	3.19	.898
AHL totals			43	18	18	2	1,038	105	1	2.76	.905

== Awards and honors ==
Award	Year
All-Hockey East Rookie Team	2004–05
All-Hockey East First Team	2007–08
AHCA East First-Team All-American	2007–08

Awards and achievements
Preceded by John Curry	Hockey East Player of the Year; 2007–08	Succeeded by Brad Thiessen
Preceded by John Curry	Hockey East Goaltending Champion; 2007–08	Succeeded by Brad Thiessen
