= Chris Collins (ice hockey) =

American ice hockey player (born 1984)

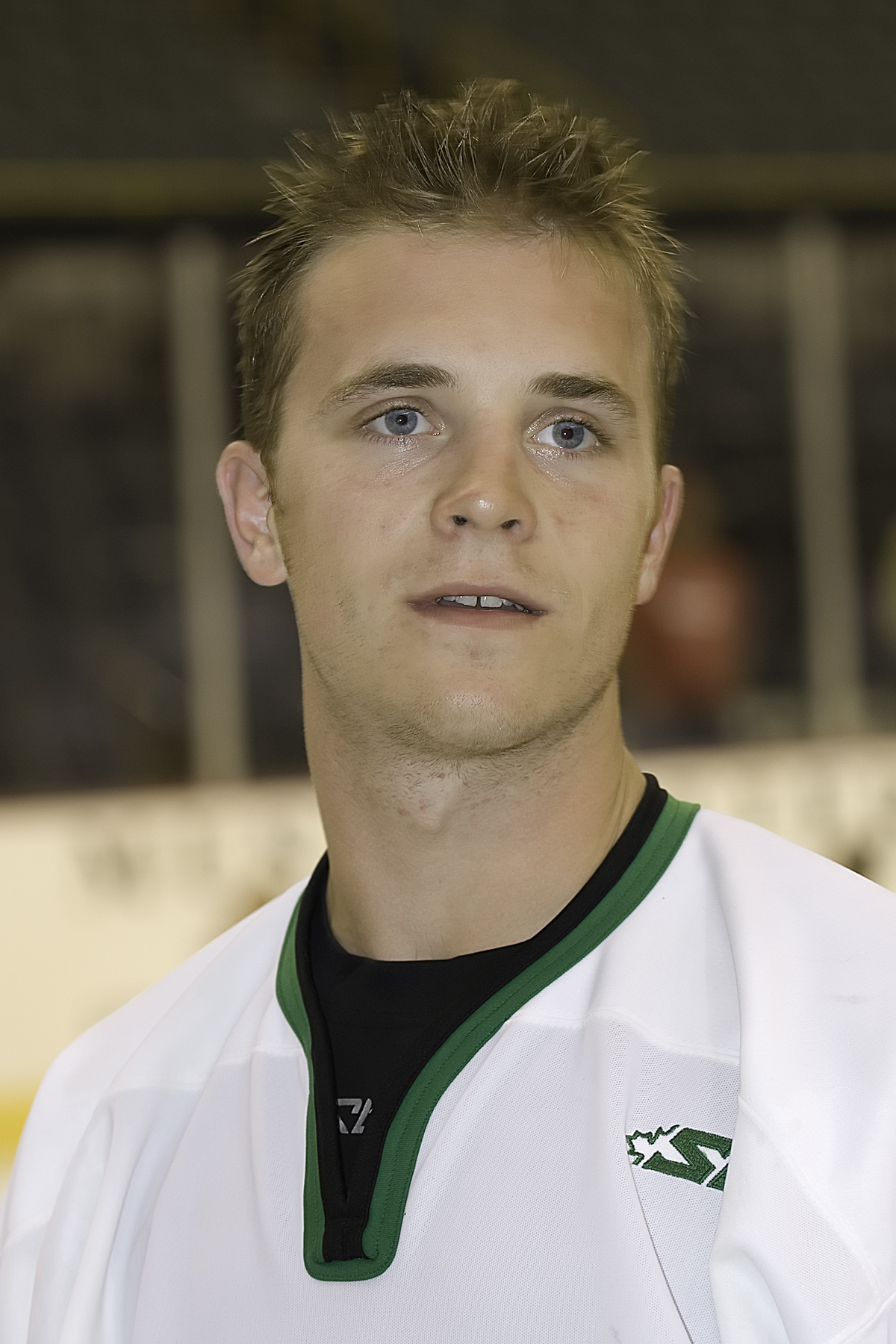
- Collins in 2007
- Born: June 8, 1984 (age 41); Fairport, New York, U.S.
- Height: 5 ft 8 in (173 cm)
- Weight: 186 lb (84 kg; 13 st 4 lb)
- Position: Left wing
- Shot: Right
- Played for: Providence Bruins; Lukko Rauma; Augsburger Panther; Wilkes-Barre/Scranton Penguins; Thomas Sabo Ice Tigers; Springfield Falcons; Norfolk Admirals
- NHL draft: Undrafted
- Playing career: 2006–2014

Chris Collins (born June 8, 1984) is an American former professional ice hockey forward who played most notably in the American Hockey League (AHL) and abroad in Europe.

== Playing career ==
=== Amateur ===
He began his junior hockey career with the Rochester Jr B Americans. He made his mark in his single season with the Des Moines Buccaneers of the United States Hockey League (USHL). He gained 2001–02 USHL All-Rookie Team honors, while also gaining the Buccaneers' Most Outstanding Rookie honor. He also got the Landmark Award, given annually to the Buccaneer fans' favorite player. While Playing for the Buccaneers Collins had 65 points—26 goals and 39 assists—in 60 regular-season games that season. He also won the team's scoring title and finished as the USHL's top-scoring rookie.

As a freshman at Boston College in 2002–03 Collins played in all 39 games, registering 23 points - 11 goals and 12 assists—making him the team's top-scoring freshman. He also racked up 16 points - eight goals and eight assists - in Hockey East action; he had five multiple-point games, two game-winning goals and three power-play goals, finished the season at +9 and earned 2002–2003 Hockey East All-Rookie Team honors. He scored his first collegiate goal in his first game at UMass.

As a sophomore at Boston College in 2003–04 Collins played in 41 games, including all 24 Hockey East contests. He racked up 19 points - nine goals and 10 assists; he recorded 14 points - seven goals and seven assists - in Hockey East action and finished the season +11 and had three multiple-point games. He also tallied two power-play goals and two game-winning goals and scored two goals, including the game-winner, against UMass Lowell.

As a junior at Boston College in 2004–05, Collins played in all 40 games, including all 24 Hockey East contests. He recorded 17 points - nine goals and eight assists -; he recorded nine points - three goals and six assists - in league action and finished the season +7, totaled 146 shots on the season, ranking second on the team and second in the league (behind teammate Patrick Eaves) and had three multiple-point games, including one multiple-goal game in Hockey East action. He also tallied two game-winning goals, two shorthanded goals and one power-play goal and scored two goals against North Dakota in the NCAA Tournament's quarterfinal round in Worcester, Massachusetts.

As a senior at Boston College in 2005–06, Collins tallied 63 points - 34 goals and 29 assists; he led Hockey East in scoring, tied for most points in the nation with Minnesota's Ryan Potulny and was one of three finalists for the Hobey Baker Award. Collins helped guide the Eagles to the Frozen Four - their sixth trip in the last nine years. He earned all-tournament team honors after notching a hat trick against North Dakota in the NCAA Tournament's semifinal-round victory in Milwaukee. Collins also captured NCAA East first-team All-America honors and Hockey East's Player of the Year award last winter.

=== Professional ===
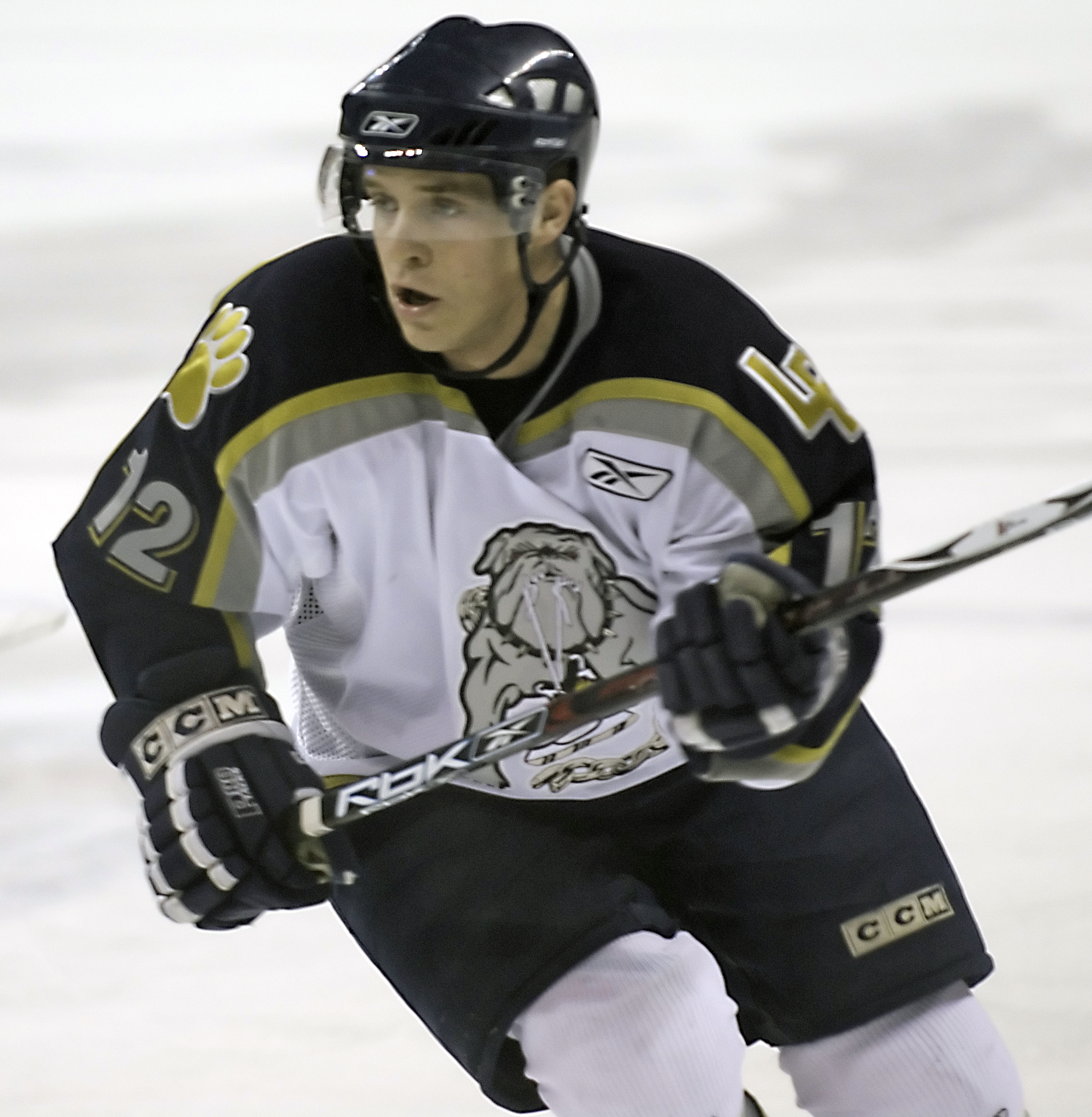
Collins playing for the Long Island Ice Dogs in 2007

Collins signed a two-year entry-level deal with the Boston Bruins and their general manager Peter Chiarelli on July 12, 2006. In his two years within the Bruins organization, Collins played primarily with American Hockey League affiliate, the Providence Bruins.

Prior to the 2008–09 season, Collins signed in Europe with Finnish team Lukko Rauma of the SM-liiga on July 10, 2008. After posting 3 goals in 19 games with Lukko, Collins was released and moved to German DEL club, Augsburger Panther on November 11, 2008.

Completing his second year with Augsburger in the 2009–10 season, Collins signed as a free agent with Pittsburgh Penguins AHL affiliate, the Wilkes-Barre/Scranton Penguins, on July 28, 2010.

Collins returned to Germany the following season, signing a one-year contract with the Thomas Sabo Ice Tigers on June 27, 2011.

On December 10, 2012, Collins signed a Professional Tryout Agreement with the Springfield Falcons of the AHL on loan from the Las Vegas Wranglers of the ECHL. He later returned for a second stint with the Wilkes-Barre/Scranton Penguins to complete the 2012–13 season.

On August 28, 2013, Collins signed a one-year ECHL contract as a free agent with the Bakersfield Condors.

== Personal ==
Chris is the son of Anne and Glenn Collins; he has 3 siblings, one of them is Greg Collins who currently plays for the Edinburgh Capitals of the Elite Ice Hockey League. He graduated from Valley High School in West Des Moines, Iowa.

== Career statistics ==
			Regular season					Playoffs
Season	Team	League	GP	G	A	Pts	PIM	GP	G	A	Pts	PIM
1998–99	Fairport High School	HS-NY
1999–2000	Fairport High School	HS-NY
1999–2000	Rochester Jr. Americans	NAHL	2	0	0	0	0	—	—	—	—	—
2000–01	Taft School	HS-Prep
2000–01	Rochester Jr. Americans	EmJHL	1	0	0	0	0	—	—	—	—	—
2001–02	Des Moines Buccaneers	USHL	60	26	39	65	112	3	1	2	3	10
2002–03	Boston College	HE	39	11	12	23	53	—	—	—	—	—
2003–04	Boston College	HE	41	9	10	19	42	—	—	—	—	—
2004–05	Boston College	HE	40	9	8	17	58	—	—	—	—	—
2005–06	Boston College	HE	42	34	29	63	26	—	—	—	—	—
2006–07	Long Beach Ice Dogs	ECHL	51	18	19	37	79	—	—	—	—	—
2006–07	Providence Bruins	AHL	17	2	0	2	12	1	0	0	0	0
2007–08	Providence Bruins	AHL	72	22	19	41	75	10	1	3	4	10
2008–09	Lukko	SM-l	19	3	2	5	10	—	—	—	—	—
2008–09	Augsburger Panther	DEL	33	14	19	33	59	4	2	2	4	0
2009–10	Augsburger Panther	DEL	47	23	23	46	91	14	7	3	10	10
2010–11	Wilkes–Barre/Scranton Penguins	AHL	77	13	21	34	47	12	3	2	5	12
2011–12	Thomas Sabo Ice Tigers	DEL	45	11	22	33	85	—	—	—	—	—
2012–13	Las Vegas Wranglers	ECHL	8	1	1	2	4	—	—	—	—	—
2012–13	Springfield Falcons	AHL	4	0	0	0	0	—	—	—	—	—
2012–13	Wilkes–Barre/Scranton Penguins	AHL	20	1	3	4	8	13	2	3	5	8
2013–14	Bakersfield Condors	ECHL	61	16	28	44	67	15	4	7	11	8
2013–14	Norfolk Admirals	AHL	2	0	0	0	2	—	—	—	—	—
ECHL totals			120	38	43	81	144	36	6	8	14	30
AHL totals			192	38	43	81	144	36	6	8	14	30
DEL totals			125	48	64	112	235	18	9	5	14	10

== Awards and honors ==
Award	Year
College
All-Hockey East Rookie Team	2002–03
All-Hockey East First Team	2005–06
AHCA East First-Team All-American	2005–06
All-NCAA All-Tournament Team	2006
Walter Brown Award (top American-born college hockey player in New England)	2006

Awards and achievements
Preceded by Patrick Eaves	Hockey East Player of the Year; 2005–06	Succeeded by John Curry
Preceded by Patrick Eaves; Ryan Shannon	Hockey East Three-Stars Award (Shared With Cory Schneider); 2005–06	Succeeded by John Curry
Preceded by Jason Guerriero	Hockey East Scoring Champion; 2005–06	Succeeded by Brian Boyle
