= John Curry (ice hockey) =

American ice hockey player (born 1984)

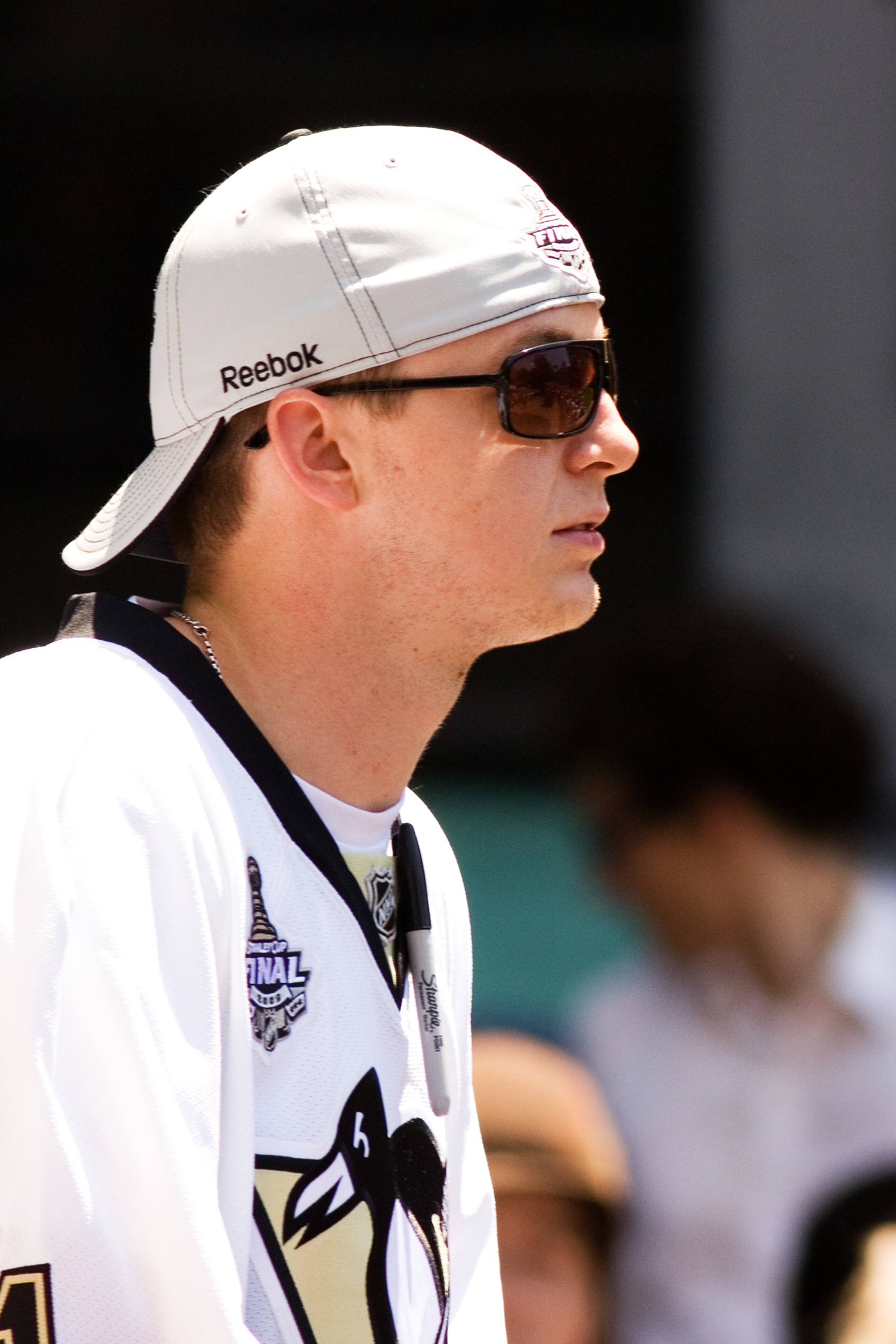
- Curry at the Pittsburgh Penguins 2009 Stanley Cup parade.
- Born: February 27, 1984 (age 42) Shorewood, Minnesota, U.S.
- Height: 5 ft 11 in (180 cm)
- Weight: 183 lb (83 kg; 13 st 1 lb)
- Position: Goaltender
- Caught: Left
- Played for: Pittsburgh Penguins; Hamburg Freezers; Minnesota Wild
- National team: United States
- NHL draft: Undrafted
- Playing career: 2007–2015

John Clifford Curry (born February 27, 1984) is an American former professional ice hockey goaltender. He played for the Hamburg Freezers of the Deutsche Eishockey Liga, and with the Pittsburgh Penguins and Minnesota Wild of the National Hockey League (NHL). He was also part of the Penguins team when they won the Stanley Cup in 2009.

== Playing career ==
=== Amateur ===
John Curry played for the Breck School Mustangs, where he compiled a 1.80 GAA as team captain and MVP in his senior season of 2001–02. After graduating from Breck, Curry attended a year at the Taft School in Watertown, Connecticut, during which he achieved a 1.46 GAA and a .920 save percentage, and was named a New England Prep School West First Team All-Star.

After high school, Curry received offers to play for numerous Division III colleges, yet enrolled at Boston University as a walk-on third-string goaltender. In his freshman year at BU, Curry played only the final 5:10 against Niagara University, filling in for starter Sean Fields in a 5–1 victory. In the 2004–05 season, Curry became the first-string goalie, posting an 18–11–3 in-conference record, participating in his first NCAA tournament, and winning his first Beanpot final, 3–2, over Northeastern University. As a junior, Curry was named to the RBK All-American second team and was a first-team Hockey East All-Star. He started in 36 of 37 games, attaining a 24–8–4 record that included a 12-game winning streak from December 30, 2005, to February 13, 2006. The team went on to win the Hockey East Championship and Curry played in another NCAA tournament. For the season he garnered awards including Hockey East Defensive Player of the Week (four times), Player of the Week, and Goaltender of the Month. Curry was named assistant captain of the Terriers in the 2006–2007 season, his final season, yet again improving his performance statistically to date and standing out as a key player in the clutch. He again won the Beanpot final, posting a career Beanpot record of 5–0 and setting a record .985 save percentage in his final tournament. He went on to win both the Beanpot MVP and the Beanpot's Eberly Award for goaltending, holding the best recorded GAA of 0.48 with 1 goal allowed. In 2007, Curry was also named a finalist for college hockey's top-player, the Hobey Baker Award, while winning Hockey East Player of the Year and getting the Hockey East Three-Stars award. Curry's college career ended abruptly when he surrendered 5 goals on 26 shots in Michigan State's first round 2007 NCAA Tournament upset of the Terriers. Curry was inducted in the Boston University Athletic Hall of Fame in May 2014.

=== Professional ===
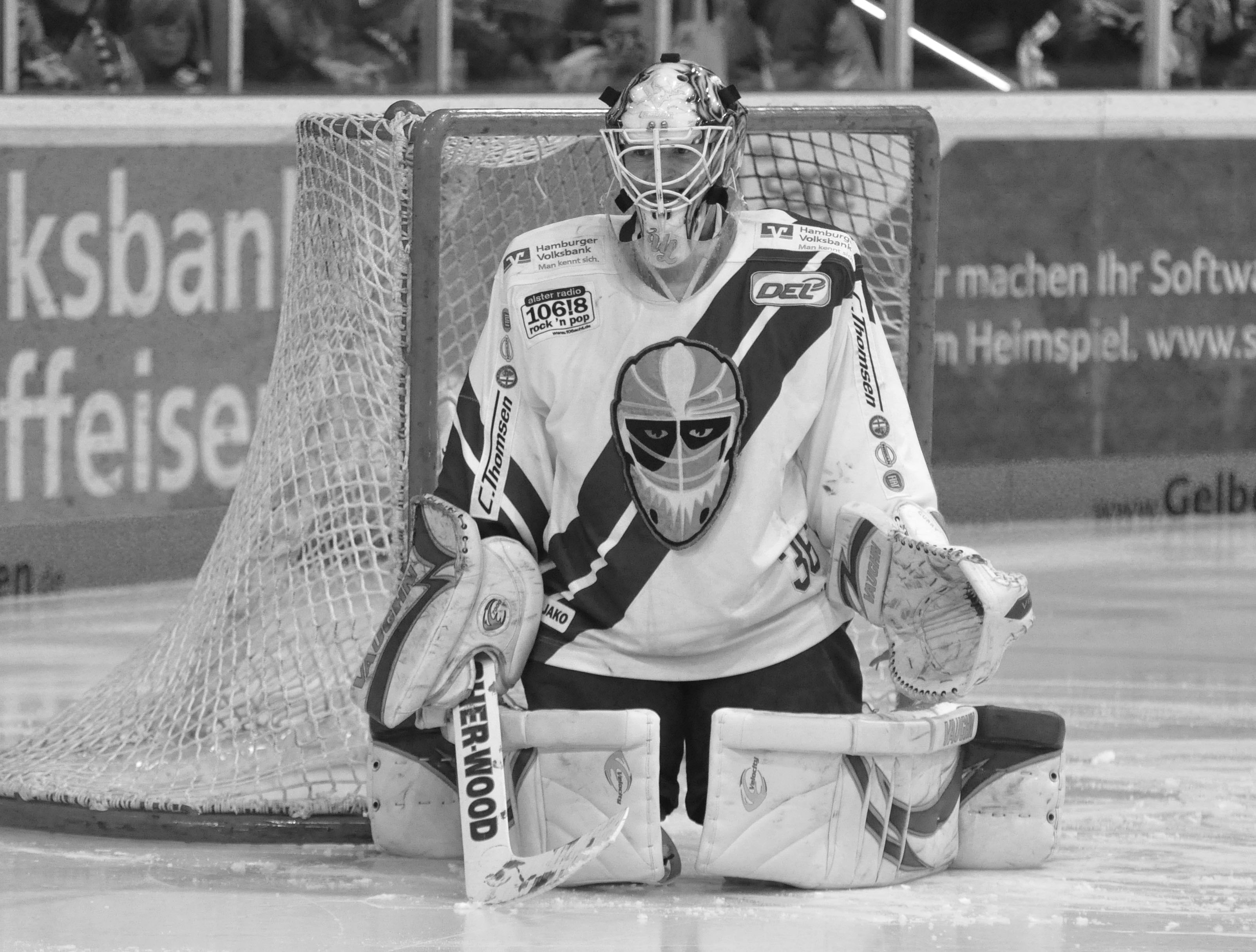
Curry playing for the Hamburg Freezers in 2012

Curry was signed as an undrafted free agent by the Pittsburgh Penguins on July 1, 2007. He was expected to split time with David Brown between the backup goaltending position on the organization's American Hockey League (AHL) affiliate Wilkes-Barre/Scranton Penguins and the starting position on the double-A ECHL Wheeling Nailers in the 2007–08 season.

With an injury to Pittsburgh starter Marc-André Fleury, WBS starter Ty Conklin was called up to the NHL at the beginning of December 2007, opening the door for Curry to start in WBS. In December 2007 he was named AHL Rookie of the Month, posting a GAA of 1.42 and .939% save percentage. Throughout the rest of the regular season, he established himself as the starter for the team, and was named to the AHL All-Rookie team. In the Calder Cup playoffs, Curry was solid, and backstopped his team to the finals, eventually losing to the Chicago Wolves in 6 games.

Curry was selected to travel to Sweden with the Pittsburgh Penguins as a backup to Marc-André Fleury and Dany Sabourin at the beginning of the 2008–09 NHL season but did not play. He was recalled in November due to an injury to Fleury and saw his first NHL game action on November 26 against the New York Islanders, replacing Sabourin in the second period and facing Joey MacDonald, whom he had fought in the AHL the season before. He made 11 saves in 30+ shutout minutes as part of a comeback win. Curry made his first NHL start on November 28 in a loss to the Buffalo Sabres, though he stopped 28 of 32 shots. He played 3 games before being sent back to the minors. During the playoffs Curry was up as a spare goalie. Curry did not dress in the playoffs, but was included on the team picture, and awarded a Stanley Cup ring. Curry did not play enough NHL games in 2008–09 to qualify for engravement on the Stanley Cup.

Curry was later recalled on January 11, 2010, to replace Marc-Andre Fleury against the Vancouver Canucks. Fleury who was out with a fractured finger, gave Curry his fourth career start with the Penguins. He gave up 5 goals on 14 shots, a save percentage of .643, before being benched early in the second period.

On June 16, 2011, Curry left the Penguins organization and signed a one-year contract with the Hamburg Freezers of the DEL. Curry left the Wilkes-Barre Penguins as the all-time leader in both regular season wins and post-season wins.

On November 7, 2012, while playing for the Orlando Solar Bears, John Curry was fined for dousing fans of the Gwinnett Gladiators after the game the previous Thursday with water.

On February 17, 2014, the Minnesota Wild, the NHL affiliate of the Iowa Wild, signed Curry to a one-year, two-way contract.

On April 10, 2014, Curry was the starting goalie against the St. Louis Blues. He recorded 45 saves on 47 shots, and received the first star of the game for his efforts.

== Personal ==
John Curry is the oldest child of parents Steve and Kathy Curry. He has one younger sister, Megan Curry, who attended Amherst College; she was a forward on the Amherst Women's Ice Hockey team from 2007 to 2011, winning two NCAA National Championships in 2009 and 2010.

== Career statistics ==
			Regular season									Playoffs
Season	Team	League	GP	W	L	T/OT	MIN	GA	SO	GAA	SV%	GP	W	L	MIN	GA	SO	GAA	SV%
2003–04	Boston University	HE	1	0	0	0	5	0	0	0.00	1.000	—	—	—	—	—	—	—	—
2004–05	Boston University	HE	33	18	11	3	1949	65	3	2.00	.922	—	—	—	—	—	—	—	—
2005–06	Boston University	HE	37	24	8	4	2166	81	3	2.24	.918	—	—	—	—	—	—	—	—
2006–07	Boston University	HE	36	17	10	8	2154	72	7	2.01	.928	—	—	—	—	—	—	—	—
2007–08	Las Vegas Wranglers	ECHL	6	4	1	0	342	16	0	2.81	.905	—	—	—	—	—	—	—	—
2007–08	Wilkes-Barre/Scranton Penguins	AHL	40	24	12	3	2343	87	3	2.23	.915	23	14	9	1358	64	1	2.83	.899
2007–08	Wheeling Nailers	ECHL	1	0	1	0	60	4	0	4.00	.867	—	—	—	—	—	—	—	—
2008–09	Wilkes-Barre/Scranton Penguins	AHL	50	33	15	1	2997	119	4	2.38	.931	7	4	3	393	22	0	3.36	.885
2008–09	Pittsburgh Penguins	NHL	3	2	1	0	150	6	0	2.40	.913	—	—	—	—	—	—	—	—
2009–10	Wilkes-Barre/Scranton Penguins	AHL	46	23	19	2	2657	127	1	2.87	.891	3	0	3	176	9	0	3.07	.908
2009–10	Pittsburgh Penguins	NHL	1	0	1	0	24	5	0	2.50	.920	—	—	—	—	—	—	—	—
2010–11	Wilkes-Barre/Scranton Penguins	AHL	41	23	13	0	2239	91	2	2.44	.905	—	—	—	—	—	—	—	—
2011–12	Hamburg Freezers	DEL	42	22	20	0	2504	114	3	2.73	.917	—	—	—	—	—	—	—	—
2012–13	Orlando Solar Bears	ECHL	32	17	11	2	1776	83	0	2.80	.910	—	—	—	—	—	—	—	—
2012–13	Houston Aeros	AHL	1	1	0	0	65	1	0	0.92	.969	—	—	—	—	—	—	—	—
2013–14	Iowa Wild	AHL	19	7	9	2	1101	48	1	2.62	.920	—	—	—	—	—	—	—	—
2013–14	Orlando Solar Bears	ECHL	13	10	2	0	767	34	0	2.66	.917	—	—	—	—	—	—	—	—
2013–14	Minnesota Wild	NHL	2	1	0	0	80	4	0	3.00	.930	—	—	—	—	—	—	—	—
2014–15	Iowa Wild	AHL	41	13	23	2	2274	101	2	2.66	.917	—	—	—	—	—	—	—	—
2014–15	Quad City Mallards	ECHL	1	1	0	0	60	2	0	2.00	.931	—	—	—	—	—	—	—	—
2014–15	Minnesota Wild	NHL	2	0	0	1	72	5	0	4.17	.800	—	—	—	—	—	—	—	—
NHL totals			8	3	2	1	326	20	0	3.68	.879	—	—	—	—	—	—	—	—

== Awards and honors ==
Award	Year
All-Hockey East Second Team	2004–05
All-Hockey East First Team	2005–06
AHCA East Second-Team All-American	2005–06
All-Hockey East First Team	2006–07
AHCA East First-Team All-American	2006–07

Awards and achievements
Preceded by Chris Collins	Hockey East Player of the Year; 2006–07	Succeeded by Kevin Regan
Preceded by Chris Collins; Cory Schneider	Hockey East Three-Stars Award; 2006–07	Succeeded by Bryan Ewing
Preceded by Cory Schneider	Hockey East Goaltending Champion; 2006–07	Succeeded by Kevin Regan
