= Tom Gilbert (ice hockey) =

American ice hockey player (born 1983)

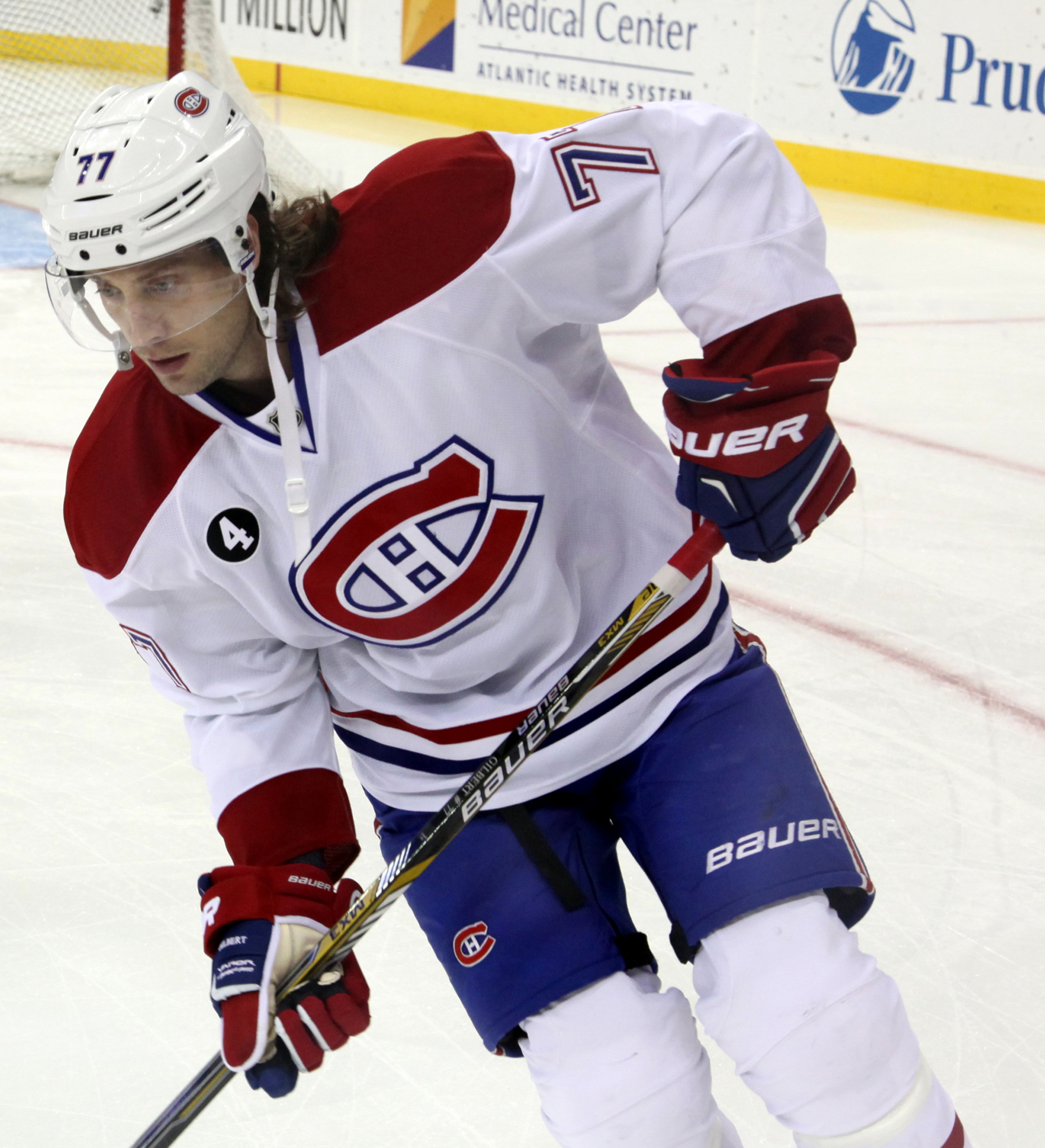
- Gilbert with the Montreal Canadiens in 2015
- Born: January 10, 1983 (age 43) Bloomington, Minnesota, U.S.
- Height: 6 ft 3 in (191 cm)
- Weight: 206 lb (93 kg; 14 st 10 lb)
- Position: Defense
- Shot: Right
- Played for: Edmonton Oilers; Minnesota Wild; Florida Panthers; Montreal Canadiens; Los Angeles Kings; Nürnberg Ice Tigers
- National team: United States
- NHL draft: 129th overall, 2002; Colorado Avalanche
- Playing career: 2006–2021

Thomas Kelly Gilbert (born January 10, 1983) is an American former professional ice hockey defenseman. Gilbert played 655 regular season games in the National Hockey League (NHL) for five teams over parts of 12 seasons for the Edmonton Oilers, Minnesota Wild, Florida Panthers, Montreal Canadiens and Los Angeles Kings.

== Playing career ==
=== Amateur ===
Gilbert played his high school hockey for Minnesota powerhouse Bloomington Jefferson High School and was the captain his senior year, 2001. That same year, he switched to forward from defense, which he played as a sophomore and junior.

=== Professional ===
Known by most scouts for his two-way ability in both ends of the ice, Gilbert was drafted in the fifth round, 129th overall, at the 2002 NHL entry draft by the Colorado Avalanche. He was later traded to the Edmonton Oilers on March 9, 2004, in exchange for struggling goaltender Tommy Salo and a sixth-round draft pick in 2005.

Gilbert played junior hockey with the Chicago Steel of the United States Hockey League (USHL). He made his debut at the University of Wisconsin–Madison with the Badgers in 2002. In the 2005–06 season, he ranked third on the team in points, and also scored the winning goal in the 2006 NCAA Championship game against Boston College.

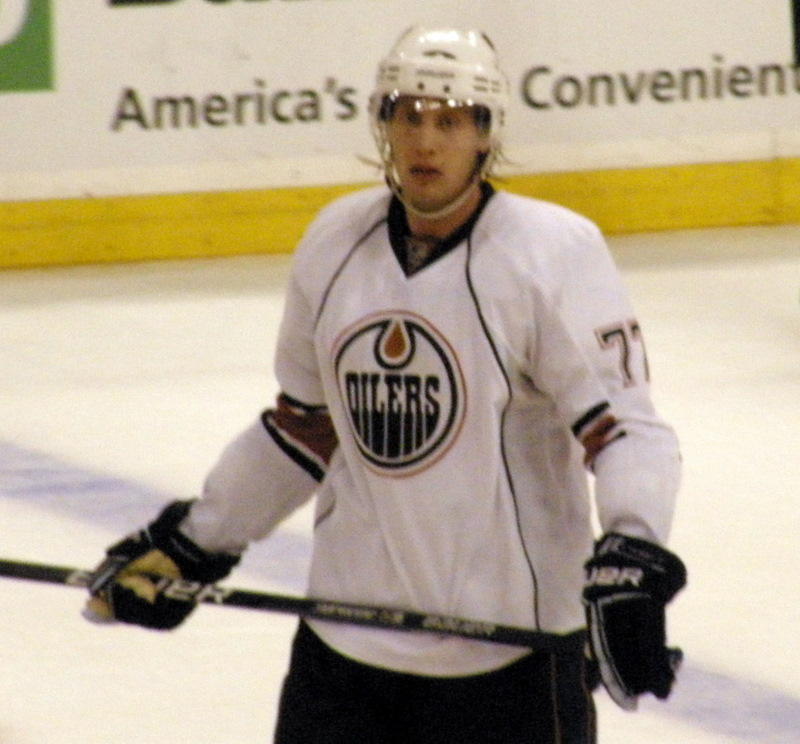
Gilbert playing for the Edmonton Oilers.

Gilbert made his professional debut in the 2006–07 season with the Wilkes-Barre/Scranton Penguins of the American Hockey League (AHL). Through 33 games, he was tied for the team lead in points among defensemen.

Due to injuries, Gilbert was called-up to the NHL in January 2007 and made his NHL debut on his 24th birthday against the San Jose Sharks. He scored his first NHL goal on February 20, 2007, against the Ottawa Senators' Martin Gerber in the final seconds of the game to send it to overtime.

On March 4, 2008, Gilbert surpassed Paul Coffey and Marc-André Bergeron for the Oilers' franchise record for most goals scored by a rookie defenseman in a season with his tenth, which came on the power play against Dan Ellis of the Nashville Predators. On April 11, 2008, Gilbert signed a six-year, $24 million contract extension with the Oilers.

At the NHL trade deadline of the 2011–12 season, on February 27, 2012, Gilbert was traded to the Minnesota Wild in exchange for defenseman Nick Schultz. Gilbert finished the season contributing five assists in 20 games.

After the lockout-shortened 2012–13 season, with the Wild experiencing cap constraints, Gilbert was used as compliance buyout of the remaining two-year of his contract, to be released as a free agent on July 3, 2013.

In September 2013, Gilbert attended the Florida Panthers' pre-season training camp as a free agent, later signing a one-year deal with the club on September 28. He established a regular position within the blueline for the Panthers in 2013–14, and by season's end had produced his best season since 2009, with 28 points in 73 games.

On July 1, 2014, having rediscovered his form with the Panthers, Gilbert signed a two-year contract as an unrestricted free agent with the Montreal Canadiens.

Upon expiry of his contract in Montreal, Gilbert signed a 1 year, $1.4 million contract to join his fifth NHL club, the Los Angeles Kings on July 1, 2016. On February 15, 2017, he was traded two weeks before the trade deadline to the Washington Capitals in exchange for a conditional 5th round draft pick (condition not met, pick not transferred). He played out the season with the Capitals AHL affiliate, the Hershey Bears.

As a free agent, Gilbert left North America after 10 seasons in agreeing to a one-year deal with German outfit, the Thomas Sabo Ice Tigers of the DEL, on July 21, 2017. He signed an extension with the team on July 3, 2018.

== Career statistics ==
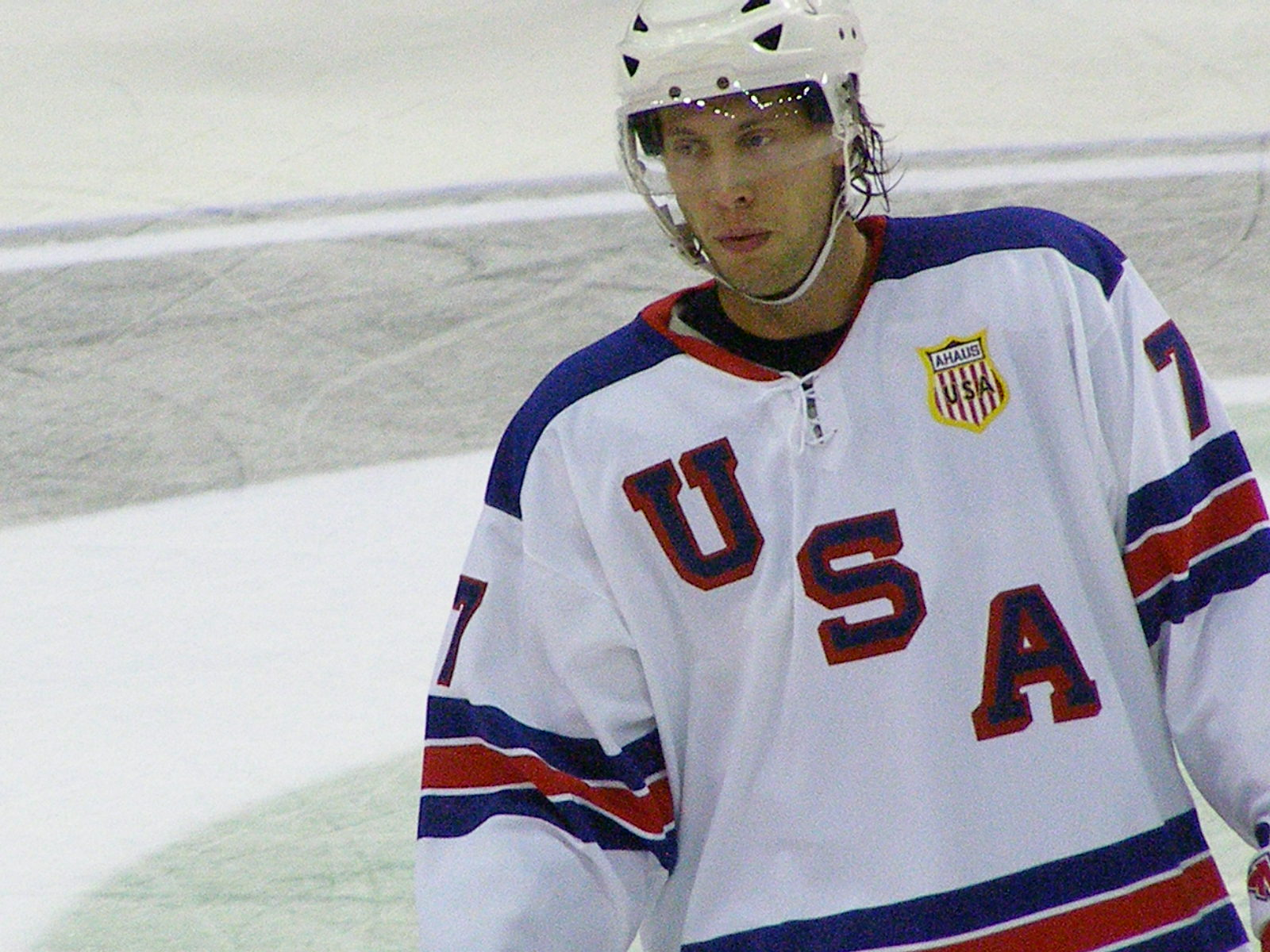
Gilbert at the 2008 IIHF World Championship.

=== Regular season and playoffs ===
			Regular season					Playoffs
Season	Team	League	GP	G	A	Pts	PIM	GP	G	A	Pts	PIM
1998–99	Bloomington Jefferson High School	HS-MN	—	—	—	—	—	—	—	—	—	—
1999–00	Bloomington Jefferson High School	HS-MN	18	7	18	25	—	—	—	—	—	—
2000–01	Bloomington Jefferson High School	HS-MN	23	20	18	38	—	—	—	—	—	—
2000–01	Chicago Steel	USHL	1	0	0	0	0	—	—	—	—	—
2001–02	Chicago Steel	USHL	57	13	15	28	62	4	0	0	0	4
2002–03	University of Wisconsin–Madison	WCHA	39	7	13	20	36	—	—	—	—	—
2003–04	University of Wisconsin–Madison	WCHA	39	6	15	21	36	—	—	—	—	—
2004–05	University of Wisconsin–Madison	WCHA	41	8	9	17	48	—	—	—	—	—
2005–06	University of Wisconsin–Madison	WCHA	41	11	19	30	28	—	—	—	—	—
2006–07	Wilkes-Barre/Scranton Penguins	AHL	48	4	26	30	32	10	1	7	8	10
2006–07	Edmonton Oilers	NHL	12	1	5	6	0	—	—	—	—	—
2007–08	Edmonton Oilers	NHL	82	13	20	33	20	—	—	—	—	—
2008–09	Edmonton Oilers	NHL	82	5	40	45	26	—	—	—	—	—
2009–10	Edmonton Oilers	NHL	82	5	26	31	16	—	—	—	—	—
2010–11	Edmonton Oilers	NHL	79	6	20	26	32	—	—	—	—	—
2011–12	Edmonton Oilers	NHL	47	3	14	17	12	—	—	—	—	—
2011–12	Minnesota Wild	NHL	20	0	5	5	8	—	—	—	—	—
2012–13	Minnesota Wild	NHL	43	3	10	13	18	5	0	0	0	2
2013–14	Florida Panthers	NHL	73	3	25	28	18	—	—	—	—	—
2014–15	Montreal Canadiens	NHL	72	4	8	12	30	12	2	3	5	14
2015–16	Montreal Canadiens	NHL	45	1	1	2	12	—	—	—	—	—
2016–17	Los Angeles Kings	NHL	18	1	4	5	6	—	—	—	—	—
2016–17	Ontario Reign	AHL	5	0	1	1	4	—	—	—	—	—
2016–17	Hershey Bears	AHL	25	3	10	13	6	9	0	2	2	0
2017–18	Thomas Sabo Ice Tigers	DEL	49	1	10	11	30	12	0	7	7	4
2018–19	Thomas Sabo Ice Tigers	DEL	31	3	15	18	18	8	1	0	1	6
2019–20	Thomas Sabo Ice Tigers	DEL	43	4	12	16	16	—	—	—	—	—
2020–21	Nürnberg Ice Tigers	DEL	36	2	9	11	12	—	—	—	—	—
NHL totals			655	45	178	223	198	17	2	3	5	16

=== International ===
Year	Team	Event	Result	GP	G	A	Pts	PIM
2008	United States	WC	6th	7	1	3	4	0
Senior totals				7	1	3	4	0

== Awards and honors ==
Award	Year
College
All-WCHA Third Team	2004–05
All-WCHA First Team	2005–06
AHCA West Second-Team All-American	2005–06
All-NCAA All-Tournament Team	2006
