= Robbie Earl =

American ice hockey player (born 1985)

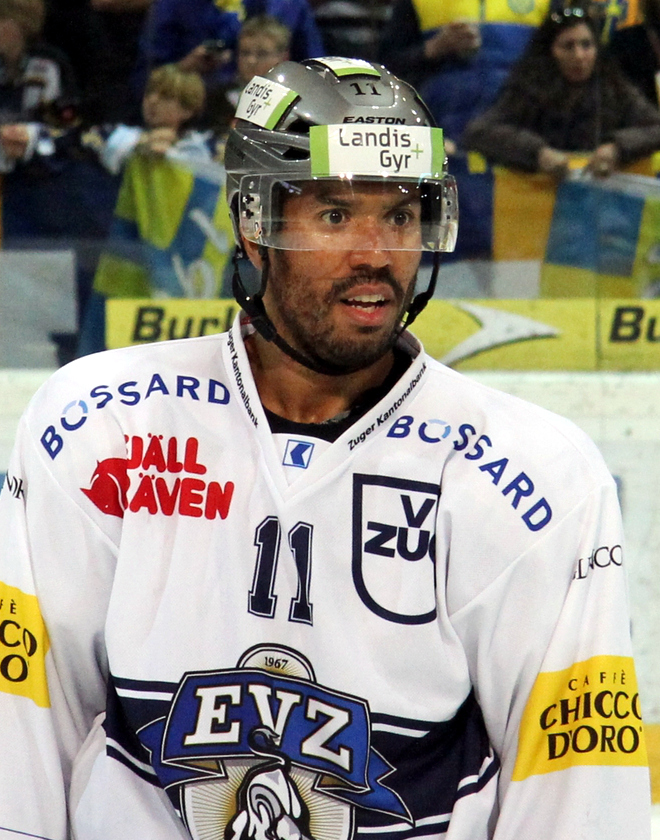
- Born: June 2, 1985 (age 41) Chicago, Illinois, U.S.
- Height: 6 ft 0 in (183 cm)
- Weight: 195 lb (88 kg; 13 st 13 lb)
- Position: Left wing
- Shoots: Left
- team Former teams: Free Agent; Toronto Maple Leafs; Minnesota Wild; EC Red Bull Salzburg; Rapperswil-Jona Lakers; EV Zug; Färjestad BK; EHC Biel; SCL Tigers
- NHL draft: 187th overall, 2004; Toronto Maple Leafs
- Playing career: 2006–present

Robert Wayne Earl (born June 2, 1985) is an American professional ice hockey forward, who is currently an unrestricted free agent. He last played for the SCL Tigers in the National League (NL). Earl was born in Chicago, Illinois, but grew up in Los Angeles, California.

== Playing career ==
=== Early career ===
As a youth, Earl played in the 1999 Quebec International Pee-Wee Hockey Tournament with the Los Angeles Junior Kings minor ice hockey team.

He played two years as a forward with the USA Hockey National Team Development Program Under-18 and Under-17 Programs. He ranked third on the under-18 team in 2002–03 with 33 points and 20 goals in 53 games, finishing fourth at the 2003 IIHF World Under-18 Championship in Yaroslavl, Russia. He was the game-winning goal scorer in the championship game of the 2002 World Under-17 Hockey Challenge in Stonewell, Manitoba and was fourth in scoring for the NTDP Under-17 Team with 22 goals and 16 assists in 58 games during 2001–02. He played for future Wisconsin head coach Mike Eaves at the NTDP.

=== Collegiate ===
In Earl's first season with the Badgers, he scored 27 points playing in a career high 42 games. As a Freshman he led the Badgers in points that season. He also managed to be nominated to the All-Rookie Team, tallying six power-play goals and three game-winning goals that year. His career first hat trick came in overtime against then league-leading North Dakota. During his freshman season, Earl was awarded with Insidecollegehockey.com’s National Player of the Week award and the WCHA Rookie of the Week award. He was the Toronto Maple Leafs’ fourth choice, 187th overall, in the 2004 NHL entry draft.

The next year, he improved his point total enough to make the roster for the Second-Team All-WCHA. This successful year led him to a team-best 20 goals, eighth total ranked eighth in the WCHA. Earl also tied the team lead with five-game-winning goals, sharing second in the WCHA where his second career hat trick came against the University of Alaska Anchorage Seawolves on November 19. He also won the WCHA Offensive Player of the Week in that same time span, the first for the University of Wisconsin–Madison since the 2000–01 season. Earl ranked third in the plus/minus department, with a rating of +17. Additionally, he started the year with a seven-game scoring streak then broke the record the same year, with eight, from January 14 to February 12.

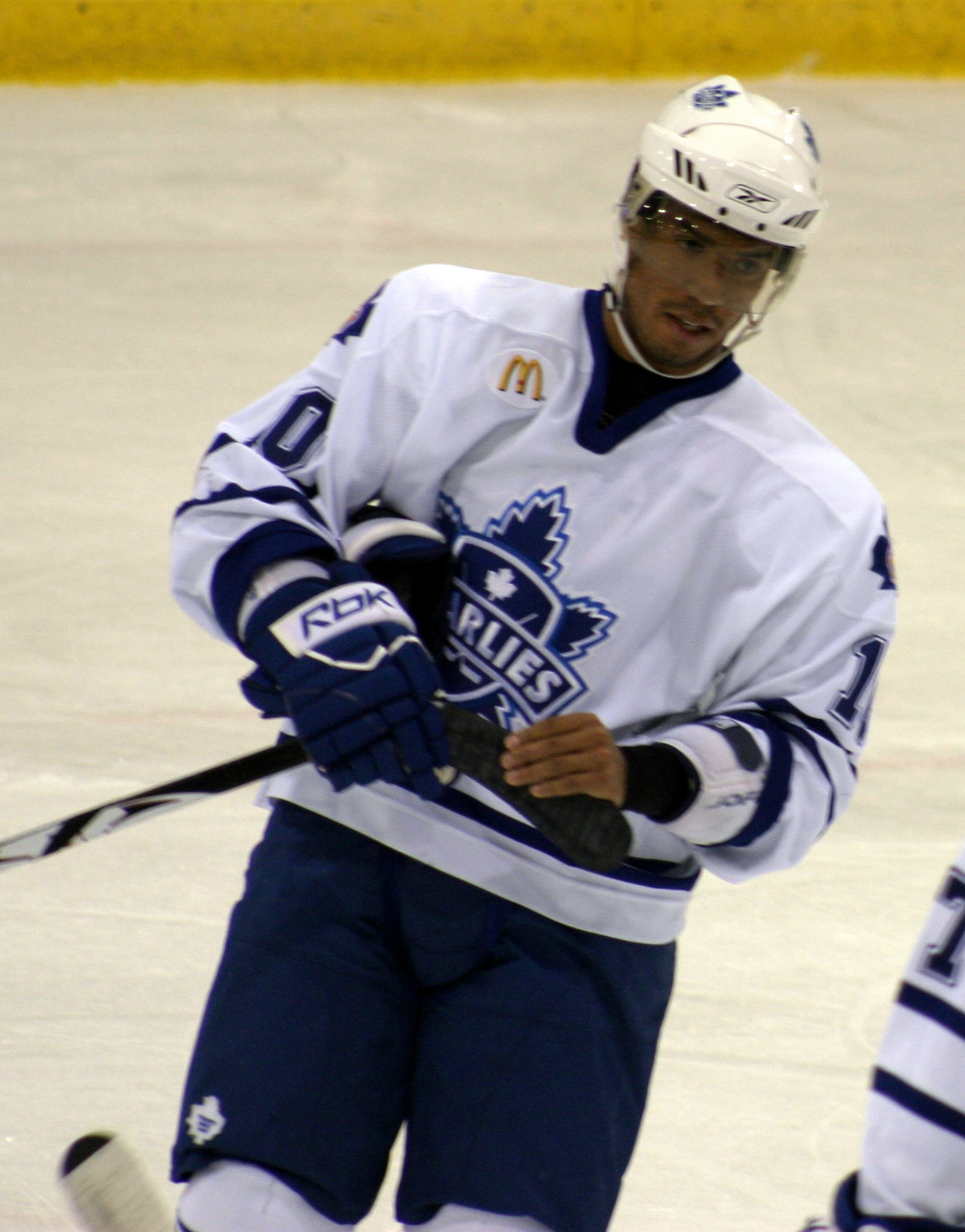
Earl during his tenure with the Toronto Marlies.

During his Junior season with Wisconsin, Earl scored a goal in the final of the 2006 NCAA Division I Men's Ice Hockey Tournament against the Boston College Eagles, helping the Badgers win the NCAA Men's Hockey Championship. He also scored twice against the University of Maine Black Bears in the Frozen Four semifinal. As a result, Earl was selected to the Frozen Four All-Tournament team and named the Most Outstanding player. After saying he would return to the Badgers for his senior season at the school's rally for the men's and women's Frozen Four Champions, two days later he announced that he decided to join the Maple Leafs instead.

=== Professional ===
Following claiming the National Title, Earl joined the Toronto Marlies, the Maple Leafs' American Hockey League affiliate and saw action in the team's first round North Division semifinal series against the Grand Rapids Griffins in for the 2006 Calder Cup Playoffs. The following year, he scored 12 goals and 18 assists and racked up 50 penalty minutes in 67 games.

During the 2007–08 season, Earl made his NHL debut with the Toronto Maple Leafs on February 2, 2008 against the Ottawa Senators, recording one assist.

In the following season, on January 21, 2009 he was traded by the Leafs to the Minnesota Wild in exchange for Ryan Hamilton and was assigned to their AHL affiliate, the Houston Aeros. In the 2009–10 season, he was recalled to Minnesota and scored his first NHL goal on November 15, 2009 against Michael Leighton of the Carolina Hurricanes.

After two full seasons in the Minnesota Wild organization, Earl left as a free agent to begin his European career by training with Dinamo Riga of the Kontinental Hockey League on a try-out basis. Released without a contract by Riga, Earl then signed a one-year deal with EC Red Bull Salzburg of the Austrian Hockey League (EBEL) on August 12, 2011. During the 2011–12 season, Earl led Salzburg with 22 goals and contributed with 50 points in 45 games.

Earl continued his European venture when he was signed to a one-year contract with Rapperswil-Jona Lakers of the Swiss National League A on March 14, 2012. In leading the cellar-dwelling Lakers in each offensive category during the 2012–13 season, Earl was extended on a two-year contract to remain with Rapperswil on February 6, 2013. In November 2013, Earl joined EV Zug signing a contract until the end of the 2014 season. After also spending the 2014-15 season with Zug, he moved to Sweden for the 2015–16 campaign, joining SHL side Färjestad BK, where he played 33 games. Earl left the club in late January 2016 and returned to Switzerland, signing with EHC Biel until the end of the 2016–17 season.

After four seasons with Biel, Earl left having concluded his contract having earlier signed a two-year contract to continue in the NL with the SCL Tigers on December 13, 2018.

== Personal ==
The Badgers' official site lists his grandparents as Tom and Pat McCusker. He also has two sisters, Brianne and Erin. He attended Ann Arbor Pioneer High School in Ann Arbor, Michigan, as part of the USA Hockey National Development Team. Before that he spent ninth grade at Mira Costa High School in Manhattan Beach, California. He was majoring in consumer science at Wisconsin before leaving early for the NHL.

== Career statistics ==
=== Regular season and playoffs ===
			Regular season					Playoffs
Season	Team	League	GP	G	A	Pts	PIM	GP	G	A	Pts	PIM
2000–01	Los Angeles Jr. Kings	16U AAA	29	48	22	72	14	—	—	—	—	—
2001–02	U.S. NTDP U17	USDP	15	8	9	17		—	—	—	—	—
2001–02	U.S. NTDP U18	NAHL	43	14	7	21	43	—	—	—	—	—
2002–03	U.S. NTDP U18	USDP	43	16	8	24	58	—	—	—	—	—
2002–03	U.S. NTDP U18	NAHL	10	4	5	9	18	—	—	—	—	—
2003–04	University of Wisconsin	WCHA	42	14	13	27	46	—	—	—	—	—
2004–05	University of Wisconsin	WCHA	41	20	24	44	62	—	—	—	—	—
2005–06	University of Wisconsin	WCHA	42	24	26	50	56	—	—	—	—	—
2005–06	Toronto Marlies	AHL	1	0	0	0	0	3	0	0	0	0
2006–07	Toronto Marlies	AHL	67	12	18	30	50	—	—	—	—	—
2007–08	Toronto Marlies	AHL	66	14	33	47	56	—	—	—	—	—
2007–08	Toronto Maple Leafs	NHL	9	0	1	1	0	—	—	—	—	—
2008–09	Toronto Marlies	AHL	36	2	8	10	28	—	—	—	—	—
2008–09	Houston Aeros	AHL	33	4	5	9	26	20	5	4	9	14
2009–10	Houston Aeros	AHL	41	10	8	18	16	—	—	—	—	—
2009–10	Minnesota Wild	NHL	32	6	0	6	6	—	—	—	—	—
2010–11	Houston Aeros	AHL	69	24	31	55	42	24	5	7	12	20
2010–11	Minnesota Wild	NHL	6	0	0	0	0	—	—	—	—	—
2011–12	EC Red Bull Salzburg	EBEL	45	22	28	50	70	6	4	3	7	6
2012–13	Rapperswil–Jona Lakers	NLA	48	22	23	45	48	—	—	—	—	—
2013–14	Rapperswil–Jona Lakers	NLA	15	7	2	9	10	—	—	—	—	—
2013–14	EV Zug	NLA	31	13	16	29	16	—	—	—	—	—
2014–15	EV Zug	NLA	48	19	26	45	34	6	1	1	2	4
2015–16	Färjestad BK	SHL	33	6	15	21	18	—	—	—	—	—
2015–16	EHC Biel	NLA	7	4	6	10	0	—	—	—	—	—
2016–17	EHC Biel	NLA	46	15	24	39	24	5	2	2	4	6
2017–18	EHC Biel	NL	42	14	20	34	55	11	2	4	6	25
2018–19	EHC Biel	NL	39	7	17	24	16	10	2	6	8	2
2019–20	SCL Tigers	NL	35	6	13	19	14	—	—	—	—	—
2020–21	SCL Tigers	NL	15	2	4	6	18	—	—	—	—	—
AHL totals			313	66	103	169	218	47	10	11	21	34
NHL totals			47	6	1	7	6	—	—	—	—	—
NL totals			326	109	151	260	235	32	7	13	20	37

=== International ===
Year	Team	Event	Result	GP	G	A	Pts	PIM
2002	United States	U17	1st place, gold medalist(s)	6	4	6	10	10
2003	United States	WJC18	4th	6	2	2	4	8
Junior totals				12	6	8	14	18

== Awards and honours ==
Award	Year
College
WCHA All-Rookie Team	2003–04
WCHA Second team	2004–05
All-NCAA All-Tournament Team	2006
Frozen Four Most Outstanding Player	2006

== See also ==
- List of black NHL players

Awards and achievements
Preceded by Peter Mannino	NCAA Tournament Most Outstanding Player; 2006	Succeeded by Justin Abdelkader
