= 2007 WCHA men's ice hockey tournament =

2007 WCHA Men's ice hockey tournament
- Dates: March 9–17, 2007
- Teams: 10
- Finals site: Xcel Energy Center; St. Paul, Minnesota
- Champions: Minnesota (14th title)
- Winning coach: Don Lucia (3rd title)
- MVP: Blake Wheeler (Minnesota)
- Attendance: 88,900
- WCHA Men's Ice Hockey Tournaments

The 2007 WCHA Men's Ice Hockey Tournament was the 48th conference playoff in league history and 53rd season where a WCHA champion was crowned. The 2007 tournament was played between March 9 and March 17, 2007, at five conference arenas and the Xcel Energy Center in St. Paul, Minnesota. By winning the tournament, Minnesota was awarded the Broadmoor Trophy and received the WCHA's automatic bid to the NCAA Tournament.

== Format ==
The first round of the postseason tournament featured a best-of-three games format. All ten conference schools participated in the tournament with teams seeded No. 1 through No. 10 according to their final conference standing, with a tiebreaker system used to seed teams with an identical number of points accumulated. The top five seeded teams each earned home ice and hosted one of the lower seeded teams.

The winners of the first round series advanced to the Xcel Energy Center for the WCHA Final Five, the collective name for the quarterfinal, semifinal, and championship rounds. The Final Five uses a single-elimination format. Teams were re-seeded No. 1 through No. 5 according to the final regular season conference standings, with the top three teams automatically advancing to the semifinals.

=== Conference standings ===
Note: PTS = Points; GP = Games played; W = Wins; L = Losses; T = Ties; GF = Goals For; GA = Goals Against

2006–07 Western Collegiate Hockey Association standings
	Conference							Overall					
	GP	W	L	T	PTS	GF	GA	GP	W	L	T	GF	GA
#5 Minnesota†*	28	18	7	3	39	91	67	44	31	10	3	139	89
#8 St. Cloud State	28	14	7	7	35	89	70	40	22	11	7	127	99
#3 North Dakota	28	13	10	5	31	93	75	43	24	14	5	153	116
#15 Denver	28	13	11	4	30	73	73	40	21	15	4	107	95
Colorado College	28	13	12	3	29	79	74	39	18	17	4	111	98
Michigan Tech	28	11	12	5	27	69	64	40	18	17	5	90	87
Wisconsin	28	12	13	3	27	59	53	41	19	18	4	93	83
Minnesota State	28	10	13	5	25	81	99	38	13	19	6	106	132
Minnesota–Duluth	28	8	16	4	20	64	84	39	13	21	5	103	121
Alaska–Anchorage	28	8	19	1	17	62	101	37	13	21	3	90	124
Championship: Minnesota † indicates conference regular season champion * indicates conference tournament champion Final rankings: USA Today/USA Hockey Magazine Top 15 Poll

== Bracket ==
Teams are reseeded after the first round

First round March 9–11
1	Minnesota	6	1	3
10	Alaska-Anchorage	2	2*	1
2	St. Cloud State	1	3*	3***
9	Minnesota-Duluth	3	2	2
3	North Dakota	5	2	–
8	Minnesota State	2	1	–
4	Denver	2	1	–
7	Wisconsin	3	2	–
5	Colorado College	1	2	0
6	Michigan Tech	2*	1	1

Quarterfinal; March 15
6	Michigan Tech	0
7	Wisconsin	4

Semifinals; March 16
1	Minnesota	4
7	Wisconsin	2
2	St. Cloud State	2
3	North Dakota	6

Championship; March 17
1	Minnesota	3*
3	North Dakota	2

Note: * denotes overtime period(s)

=== First round ===
==== (1) Minnesota vs. (10) Alaska-Anchorage ====
March 9	Minnesota	6 – 2	Alaska-Anchorage	Mariucci Arena	Recap
(Gordon, Johnson) Jay Barriball - 06:56 (Goligoski, Gordon) Mike Vannelli - PP - 19:43		First period	14:49 - PP - Paul Crowder (Clark, Hunt)
(Goligoski, Vannelli) Jay Barriball - GW PP - 13:19 (Bostrom, O'Brien) Ryan Flynn - 14:54		Second period	09:17 - PP - Merit Waldrop (Beagle, Anderson)
(Gordon, Johnson) Blake Wheeler - 01:20 (O'Brien) Justin Bostrom - PP - 18:00		Third period	No scoring
( 23 saves / 25 shots ) Kellen Briggs		Goalie stats	Jon Olthuis ( 26 saves / 32 shots )

March 10	Minnesota	1 – 2	OT	Alaska-Anchorage	Mariucci Arena	Recap
(Stoa, Kaufmann) Kyle Okposo - PP - 15:34		First period		No scoring
No scoring		Second period		No scoring
No scoring		Third period		16:25 - Josh Lunden (Clark, Backstrom)
No scoring		First overtime period		05:45 - GW - Luke Beaverson (Kronschnabel, Bourne)
( 26 saves / 28 shots ) Kellen Briggs		Goalie stats		Nathan Lawson ( 25 saves / 26 shots )

March 11	Minnesota	3 – 1	Alaska-Anchorage	Mariucci Arena	Recap
No Scoring		First period	05:43 - Kevin Clark (Lunden)
(Barriball, Vannelli) Ben Gordon - PP - 04:22		Second period	No scoring
(Flynn, Lucia) Mike Carman - GW - 08:44 (Lucia) Kyle Okposo - SH - 18:35		Third period	No scoring
( 11 saves / 12 shots ) Jeff Frazee		Goalie stats	Nathan Lawson ( 26 saves / 29 shots )

Minnesota won series 2–1

==== (2) St. Cloud State vs. (9) Minnesota-Duluth ====
March 9	St. Cloud State	1 – 3	Minnesota-Duluth	National Hockey Center	Recap
No Scoring		First period	No scoring
(Swanson, Stephenson) Dan Kronick - 09:01		Second period	00:33 - Bryan McGregor (Sharp); 14:46 - GW - Mike Curry
No scoring		Third period	16:58 - PP - Josh Meyers (Sharp, Raymond)
( 21 saves / 24 shots ) Bobby Goepfert		Goalie stats	Josh Johnson ( 27 saves / 28 shots )

March 10	St. Cloud State	3 – 2	OT	Minnesota-Duluth	National Hockey Center	Recap
(Stephenson, Borer) Andrew Gordon - 16:10		First period		No scoring
(Kronick, Swanson) Ryan Lasch - PP - 09:46		Second period		09:46 - PP - Jordan Fulton (Garrison, McKnight)
No scoring		Third period		16:06 - Josh Meyers (Raymond, Sharp)
(Gordon, Fletcher) Nate Dey - GW - 17:01		First overtime period		No scoring
( 28 saves / 30 shots ) Bobby Goepfert		Goalie stats		Josh Johnson ( 42 saves / 45 shots )

March 11	St. Cloud State	3 – 2	3OT	Minnesota-Duluth	National Hockey Center	Recap
(Raduns, Kronick) Ryan Lasch - 18:33		First period		No scoring
No scoring		Second period		01:26 - PP - Bryan McGregor (Niskanen, Raymond); 07:00 - Nick Kemp (Geris)
John Swanson - 04:11		Third period		No scoring
(Borer) Andreas Nödl - GW - 11:33		Third overtime period		No scoring
( 67 saves / 69 shots ) Bobby Goepfert		Goalie stats		Josh Johnson ( 62 saves / 65 shots )

St. Cloud State won series 2–1

==== (3) North Dakota vs. (8) Minnesota State ====
March 9	North Dakota	5 – 2	Minnesota State	Ralph Engelstad Arena	Recap
(Toews, Chorney) T. J. Oshie - 09:05 (Zajac) Kyle Radke - 18:03		First period	No scoring
(Chorney, Bina) Ryan Duncan - GW PP - 01:56 (Kozek, Kaip) Erik Fabian - 02:26 (Oshie, Lee) Jonathan Toews - 09:07		Second period	01:09 - PP - Kurtis Kisio (Mouillierat, Irwin); 16:22 - Mick Berge (Kalinski)
No scoring		Third period	No scoring
( 29 saves / 31 shots ) Philippe Lamoureux		Goalie stats	Mike Zacharias ( 15 saves / 20 shots ) / Dan Tormey ( 18 saves / 18 shots )

March 10	North Dakota	2 – 1	Minnesota State	Ralph Engelstad Arena	Recap
No Scoring		First period	No scoring
(Chorney, Toews) Ryan Duncan - PP - 12:45 (Fabian, Kozek) Rylan Kaip - GW - 18:28		Second period	15:43 - Joel Hanson (Kilburg, Harrison)
No scoring		Third period	No scoring
( 23 saves / 24 shots ) Philippe Lamoureux		Goalie stats	Dan Tormey ( 25 saves / 27 shots )

North Dakota won series 2–0

==== (4) Denver vs. (7) Wisconsin ====
March 9	Denver	2 – 3	Wisconsin	Magness Arena	Recap
No Scoring		First period	14:33 - Joe Piskula; 17:44 - Ben Street (Klubertanz)
(Trotter, Veideman) Ryan Dingle - 05:14 (Gifford) J.D. Corbin - 15:44		Second period	No scoring
No scoring		Third period	15:36 - GW - Jake Dowell (Davies, Olinger)
( 34 saves / 37 shots ) Peter Mannino		Goalie stats	Brian Elliott ( 23 saves / 25 shots )

March 10	Denver	1 – 2	Wisconsin	Magness Arena	Recap
No Scoring		First period	10:48 - Andrew Joudrey (Skille, Likens); 15:27 - GW SH - Andy Brandt (Carlson, Likens)
(Testwuide, Dingle) Rhett Rakhshani - 08:27		Second period	No scoring
No scoring		Third period	No scoring
( 35 saves / 37 shots ) Glenn Fisher		Goalie stats	Brian Elliott ( 35 saves / 36 shots )

Wisconsin won series 2–0

==== (5) Colorado College vs. (6) Michigan Tech ====
March 9	Colorado College	1 – 2	OT	Michigan Tech	World Arena, Colorado Springs	Recap
No Scoring		First period		No scoring
(Kilpatrick, Rau) Scott McCulloch - PP - 08:44		Second period		18:09 - Peter Rouleau (Shelast, Helminen)
No scoring		Third period		No scoring
No scoring		First overtime period		00:39 - GW - Jimmy Kerr (St. Louis, Gagne)
( 25 saves / 27 shots ) Matt Zaba		Goalie stats		Michael Teslak ( 26 saves / 27 shots )

March 10	Colorado College	2 – 0	Michigan Tech	World Arena, Colorado Springs	Recap
No Scoring		First period	No scoring
(Cox, Kilpatrick) Scott Thauwald - GW - 15:02		Second period	No scoring
Andreas Vlassopoulos - 05:50		Third period	No scoring
( 29 saves / 29 shots ) Matt Zaba		Goalie stats	Michael Teslak ( 20 saves / 22 shots )

March 11	Colorado College	0 – 1	Michigan Tech	World Arena, Colorado Springs	Recap
No Scoring		First period	12:59 - GW - Ryan Bunger (Kivisto, Lord)
No scoring		Second period	No scoring
No scoring		Third period	No scoring
( 24 saves / 25 shots ) Matt Zaba		Goalie stats	Michael Teslak ( 18 saves / 18 shots )

Michigan Tech won series 2–1

=== Quarterfinal ===
==== (6) Michigan Tech vs. (7) Wisconsin ====
March 15	Michigan Tech	0 – 4	Wisconsin	Xcel Energy Center	Recap
No Scoring		First period	01:45 - GW - Blake Geoffrion (Drewiske, McBain)
No scoring		Second period	02:42 - PP - Michael Davies (Joudrey, McBain); 04:14 - Andrew Joudrey (Klubertanz, Piskula)
No scoring		Third period	10:12 - Tom Gorowsky (Street, Klubertanz)
( 27 saves / 31 shots ) Michael Teslak		Goalie stats	Brian Elliott ( 26 saves / 26 shots )

=== Semifinals ===
==== (1) Minnesota vs. (7) Wisconsin ====
March 16	Minnesota	4 – 2	Wisconsin	Xcel Energy Center	Recap
(Barriball, Schack) Blake Wheeler - 05:52		First period	19:16 - Davis Drewiske (Ford, Geoffrion)
(Lucia, Carman) Mike Vannelli - 11:00 (Goligoski, Vannelli) Blake Wheeler - GW PP - 19:56		Second period	01:37 - Jake Dowell (Olinger, Piskula)
Blake Wheeler - EN - 19:56		Third period	No scoring
( 29 saves / 31 shots ) Kellen Briggs		Goalie stats	Brian Elliott ( 21 saves / 24 shots )

==== (2) St. Cloud State vs. (3) North Dakota ====
March 16	St. Cloud State	2 – 6	North Dakota	Xcel Energy Center	Recap
No Scoring		First period	16:20 - Jonathan Toews (Duncan, Oshie)
(Gordon, Dey) Andreas Nödl - 04:09 (Dey, Nödl) Andrew Gordon - PP - 10:06		Second period	05:19 - Chris VandeVelde (Porter, Watkins); 08:43 - GW - Chris VandeVelde (Watkins, Chorney); 12:29 - Jonathan Toews (Oshie, Genoway); 13:12 - Matt Watkins (VandeVelde, Jones)
No scoring		Third period	09:06 - Chris Porter (Kaip, Fabian)
( 29 saves / 35 shots ) Bobby Goepfert		Goalie stats	Philippe Lamoureux ( 25 saves / 27 shots )

=== Third Place ===
==== (2) St. Cloud State vs. (7) Wisconsin ====
March 17	St. Cloud State	3 – 4	OT	Wisconsin	Xcel Energy Center	Recap
(Gordan, Dey) Andreas Nödl - 00:29		First period		12:39 - Jake Dowell (Carlson, Davies)
(Kronick, Swanson) Ryan Lasch - PP - 03:18 (Kronick, Lasch) John Swanson - PP - 10:20		Second period		18:38 - PP - Andy Brandt (Skille, Street)
No scoring		Third period		13:00 - Jack Skille (Joudrey, Klubertanz)
No scoring		First overtime period		04:50 - GW - Ben Street (Joudrey, Klubertanz)
( 29 saves / 33 shots ) Bobby Goepfert		Goalie stats		Brian Elliott ( 2 saves / 3 shots ) / Shane Connelly ( 24 saves / 26 shots )

=== Championship ===
==== (1) Minnesota vs. (3) North Dakota ====
March 17	Minnesota	3 – 2	OT	North Dakota	Xcel Energy Center	Recap
No Scoring		First period		No scoring
(Lucia, Carman) Erik Johnson - 08:26 (Wheeler, Vannelli) Ben Gordon - 15:36		Second period		13:24 - PP - Taylor Chorney (Bina, Oshie)
No scoring		Third period		01:54 - PP - Ryan Duncan (Chorney, Bina)
(Barriball) Blake Wheeler - GW - 03:25		First overtime period		No scoring
( 23 saves / 25 shots ) Jeff Frazee		Goalie stats		Philippe Lamoureux ( 38 saves / 41 shots )

== Tournament awards ==
=== All-Tournament Team ===
- F Blake Wheeler* (Minnesota)
- F Jonathan Toews (North Dakota)
- F Jake Dowell (Wisconsin)
- D Mike Vannelli (Minnesota)
- D Taylor Chorney (North Dakota)
- G Philippe Lamoureux (North Dakota)

* Most Valuable Player(s)

== See also ==
- Western Collegiate Hockey Association men's champions
