= Ryan Duncan =

Ryan Duncan may refer to:

- Ryan Duncan (ice hockey)
- Ryan Duncan (footballer)
