= Jake Dowell =

American ice hockey player (born 1985)

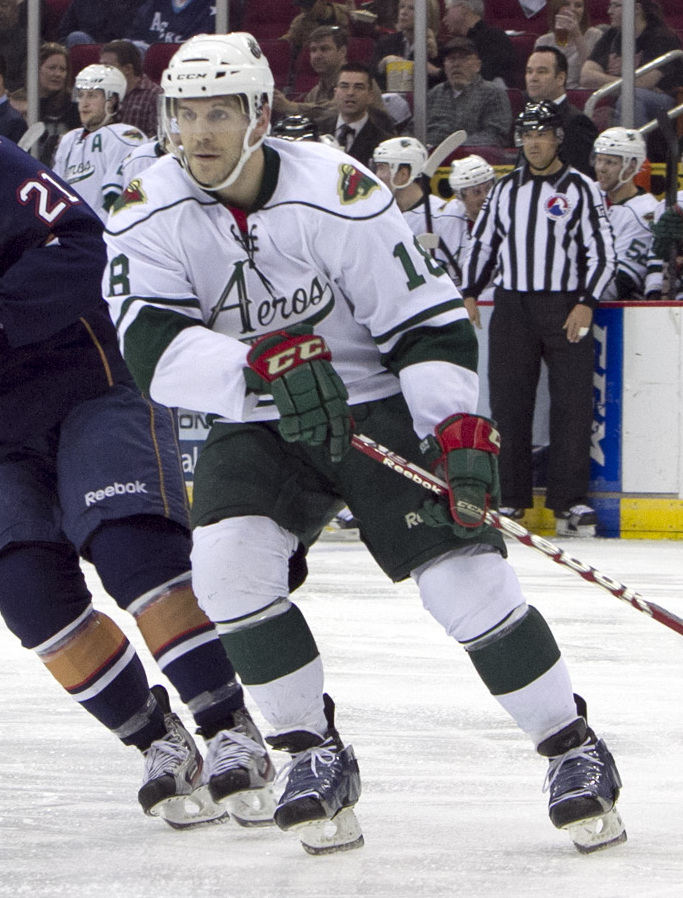
- Dowell with the Houston Aeros in February 2013
- Born: March 4, 1985 (age 41) Eau Claire, Wisconsin, U.S.
- Height: 6 ft 0 in (183 cm)
- Weight: 202 lb (92 kg; 14 st 6 lb)
- Position: Center
- Shot: Left
- Played for: Chicago Blackhawks; Dallas Stars; Minnesota Wild; EHC Black Wings Linz
- NHL draft: 140th overall, 2004; Chicago Blackhawks
- Playing career: 2006–2018

Jacob Charles Dowell (born March 4, 1985) is an American former professional ice hockey center who played in the National Hockey League (NHL) with the Chicago Blackhawks, Dallas Stars and Minnesota Wild.

== Playing career ==
=== Youth ===
Dowell grew up in Eau Claire, Wisconsin and played for Memorial High School in Eau Claire for two seasons, totaling 90 points. In both seasons, Dowell helped lead the Old Abes to sectional championships and state tournament berths.

Dowell left Memorial High School to be a part of the USA Hockey U-18 Developmental Program in Ann Arbor, Michigan in the year 2001. Later, Dowell returned to Wisconsin to play college hockey for the Wisconsin Badgers where he won a National Championship. Dowell was selected in the fifth round of the 2004 NHL entry draft by the Chicago Blackhawks.

=== Professional (2007–2018) ===
Dowell signed an entry-level contract with Chicago in July 2007. On November 23, 2007, Dowell scored a short-handed goal in his first NHL game, a 2–1 win over the Calgary Flames. Dowell broke his foot the next game against the Edmonton Oilers, but recovered from the injury after missing 12 games to play 17 more games in the 2007–08 season.

Dowell was only called up to play in one contest in the 2008–09 season. He was on the Blackhawks active roster as a black ace against Vancouver and Detroit in the playoffs, but he did not play.

During the 2009–10 season, Dowell played three games for the Hawks with a goal and an assist for two points along with 78 games for the Rockford IceHogs in the AHL with seven goals and 16 assists for 23 points. After the Blackhawks defeated the Philadelphia Flyers in six games in the 2010 Stanley Cup Finals, Dowell received a ring from the Blackhawks but his name was not included on the Cup due to not playing any playoff games and only playing three games in the regular season and none in the playoffs.

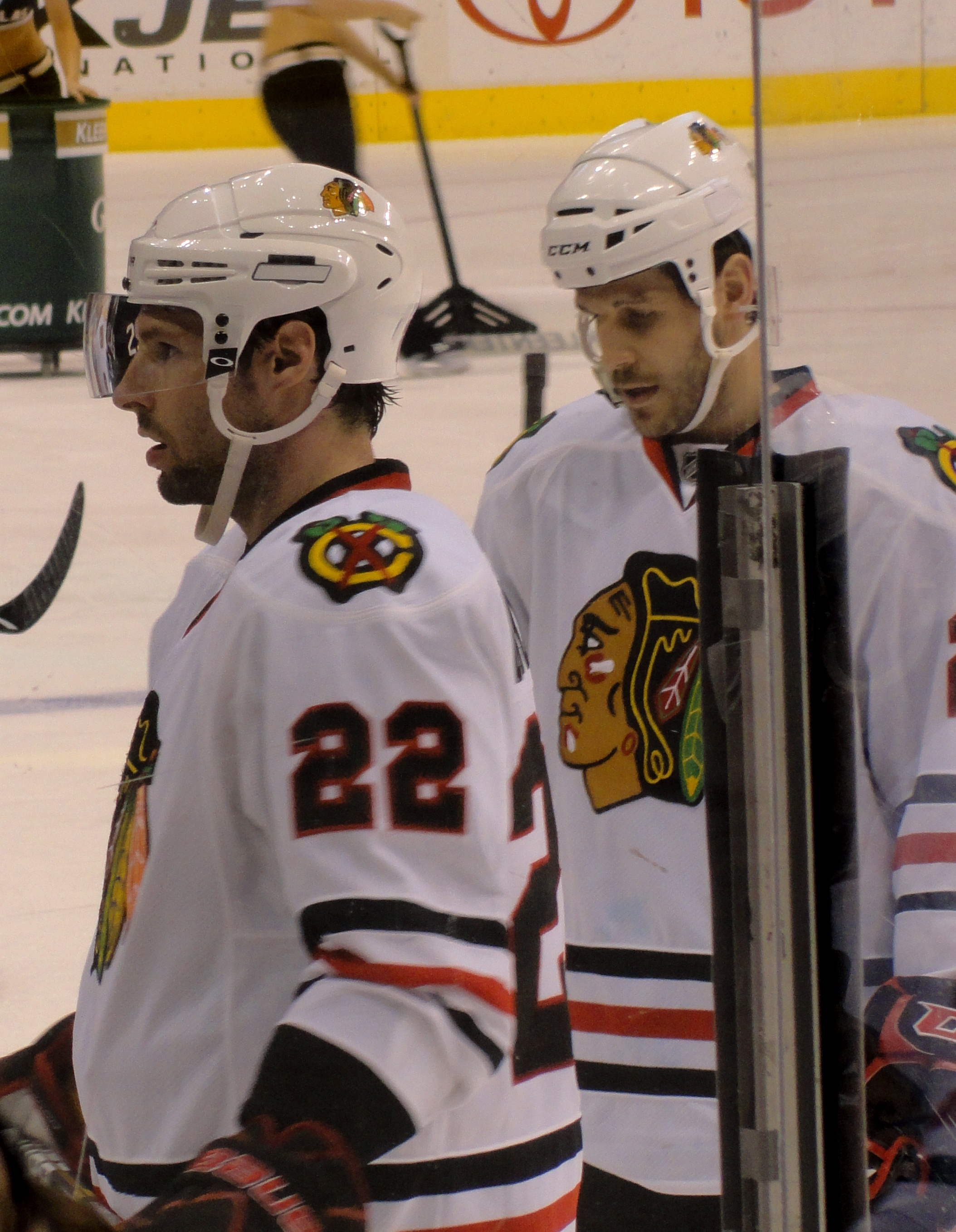
Dowell (right) and Troy Brouwer with the Chicago Blackhawks in February 2011

Dowell finished the 2010–11 season, his first full season at the NHL level with six goals, 15 assists and 21 points in 79 games played regularly playing on the third and fourth lines and occasional time on the teams penalty killing units. The defending Stanley Cup champion Blackhawks narrowly qualified for the playoffs as the eighth and final seed in the Western Conference and Dowell made his Stanley Cup playoff debut on April 13, 2011, in game 1 of the first round against the Presidents' Trophy-winning Vancouver Canucks where the Blackhawks lost with a score of 2–0. The Blackhawks would eventually fall to the Canucks in seven games and Dowell finished the playoffs with no points in two games. After the Blackhawks elimination from the playoffs, Dowell revealed he had been playing with a left ankle fracture that was likely suffered on February 1, 2011, in a 7–4 win over the Columbus Blue Jackets as a result of blocking a slap shot from Blue Jackets defenseman Anton Strålman.

On July 1, 2011, the Dallas Stars announced that the club had agreed to terms with center Dowell on a one-year contract worth $800,000. On February 21, 2012, in a 3–0 win over the Montreal Canadiens, Dowell suffered a broken finger, resulting in him missing the next seven games. He finished the 2011–12 season, Dowell played in 52 games contributing with two goals and five assists for seven points.

On July 4, 2012, Dowell signed a two-year free agent contract with the Minnesota Wild. Over the duration of his contract with the Wild, Dowell amassed just three games (two games in the lockout-shortened 2012–13 season and one game in the 2013–14 season, whilst primarily playing with AHL affiliates, the Houston Aeros and the Iowa Wild.

On July 28, 2014, Dowell signed a one-year free agent contract with the Hamilton Bulldogs of the American Hockey League.

On August 31, 2015, Dowell signed a professional tryout contract in returning to attend the Rockford IceHogs training camp for the 2015–16 season. After five games with the IceHogs on October 22, 2015, Dowell was signed to an AHL contract to continue in Rockford for the remainder of the season.

After captaining the IceHogs in the 2016–17 season, and posting 15 points in 66 games, Dowell as a free agent opted to sign his first contact abroad in agreeing to a one-year deal with Austrian club, EHC Black Wings Linz of the EBEL, on May 12, 2017.

== Personal life ==
Dowell and his family have worked to raise awareness and find a cure for Huntington's disease, a disease which has afflicted his brother and his father, whom he lost to the disease in February 2014 and August 2018, respectively. The Dowells host fundraisers to battle the disease. Dowell himself has tested negative for Huntington's in December 2015. For his work to cure Huntington's while still committing to playing hockey, Dowell was awarded the Fred T. Hunt Memorial Award during the 2013–14 season.

Dowell is married to his wife, Carly, together they have one daughter and one son.

== Career statistics ==
=== Regular season and playoffs ===
			Regular season					Playoffs
Season	Team	League	GP	G	A	Pts	PIM	GP	G	A	Pts	PIM
2000–01	Memorial High School	HSWI	24	25	30	55		—	—	—	—	—
2001–02	US NTDP U17	USDP	11	5	1	6	14	—	—	—	—	—
2001–02	US NTDP U18	NAHL	44	5	12	17	51	—	—	—	—	—
2002–03	US NTDP U18	NAHL	9	2	2	4	13	—	—	—	—	—
2002–03	US NTDP U18	USDP	54	8	17	25	54	—	—	—	—	—
2003–04	University of Wisconsin	WCHA	37	6	13	19	48	—	—	—	—	—
2004–05	University of Wisconsin	WCHA	38	12	14	26	74	—	—	—	—	—
2005–06	University of Wisconsin	WCHA	43	5	15	20	42	—	—	—	—	—
2006–07	University of Wisconsin	WCHA	41	19	6	25	54	—	—	—	—	—
2006–07	Norfolk Admirals	AHL	9	2	3	5	8	6	0	3	3	4
2007–08	Rockford IceHogs	AHL	49	7	10	17	64	12	1	1	2	6
2007–08	Chicago Blackhawks	NHL	19	2	1	3	10	—	—	—	—	—
2008–09	Rockford IceHogs	AHL	75	6	14	20	128	4	0	0	0	0
2008–09	Chicago Blackhawks	NHL	1	0	0	0	2	—	—	—	—	—
2009–10	Rockford IceHogs	AHL	78	7	16	23	96	4	0	0	0	0
2009–10	Chicago Blackhawks	NHL	3	1	1	2	5	—	—	—	—	—
2010–11	Chicago Blackhawks	NHL	79	6	15	21	63	2	0	0	0	0
2011–12	Dallas Stars	NHL	52	2	5	7	53	—	—	—	—	—
2012–13	Houston Aeros	AHL	37	4	5	9	34	4	0	1	1	4
2012–13	Minnesota Wild	NHL	2	0	0	0	0	—	—	—	—	—
2013–14	Iowa Wild	AHL	57	7	12	19	56	—	—	—	—	—
2013–14	Minnesota Wild	NHL	1	0	0	0	0	—	—	—	—	—
2014–15	Hamilton Bulldogs	AHL	76	5	10	15	75	—	—	—	—	—
2015–16	Rockford IceHogs	AHL	72	11	24	35	99	3	0	2	2	4
2016–17	Rockford IceHogs	AHL	66	4	11	15	101	—	—	—	—	—
2017–18	EHC Liwest Black Wings Linz	EBEL	22	4	5	9	31	—	—	—	—	—
NHL totals			157	11	22	33	133	2	0	0	0	0

=== International ===
Year	Team	Event	Result	GP	G	A	Pts	PIM
2002	United States	U17	1st place, gold medalist(s)	6	2	1	3	2
2003	United States	WJC18	4th	6	0	1	1	10
2004	United States	WJC	1st place, gold medalist(s)	6	0	2	2	2
2005	United States	WJC	4th	7	0	3	3	12
Junior totals				25	2	7	9	26

== Awards and honors ==
Award	Year
College
WCHA All-Tournament Team	2007
AHL
Fred T. Hunt Memorial Award	2014
