= Blake Wheeler =

American ice hockey player (born 1986)

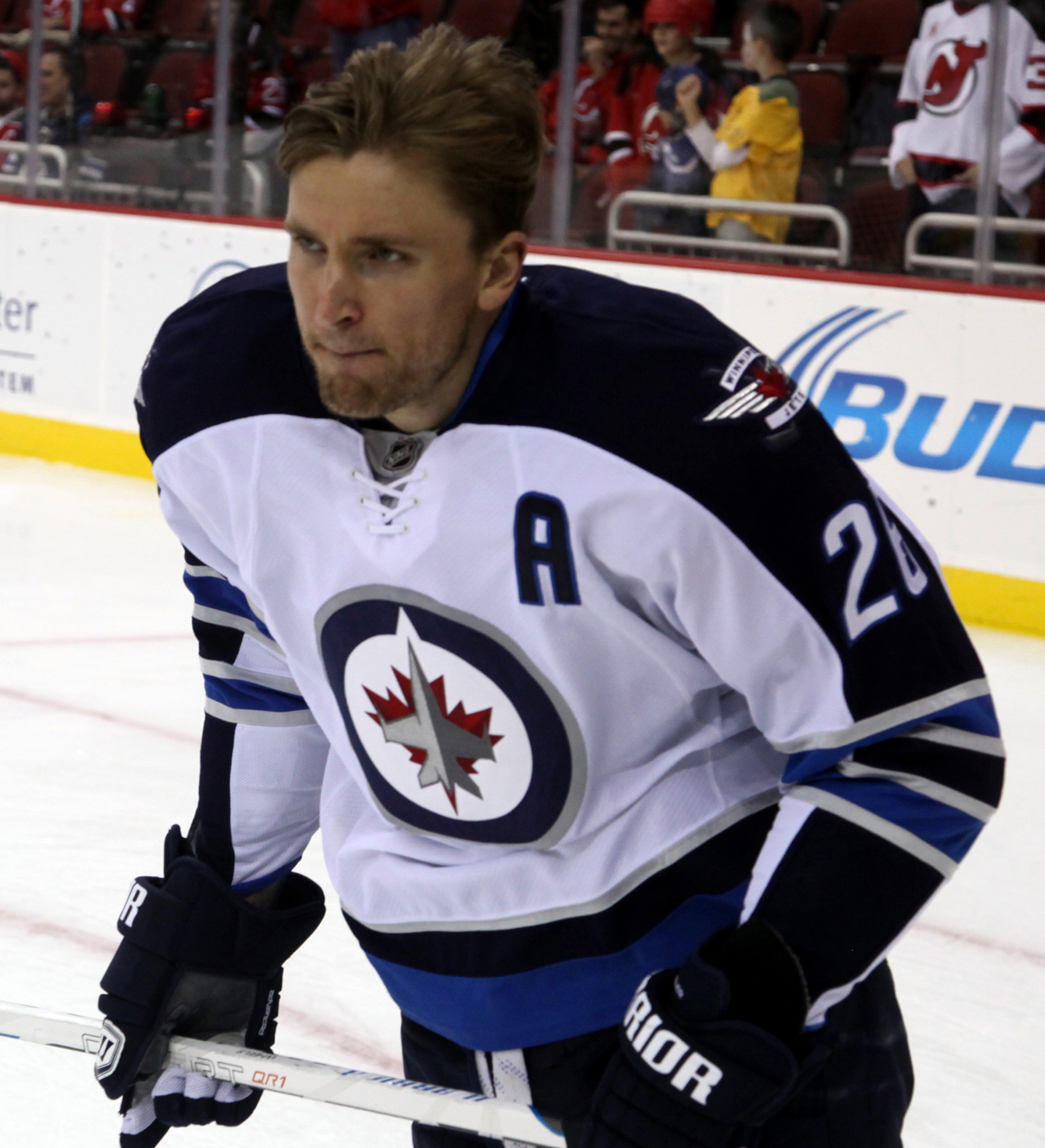
- Wheeler with the Winnipeg Jets in 2014
- Born: August 31, 1986 (age 39) Plymouth, Minnesota, U.S.
- Height: 6 ft 5 in (196 cm)
- Weight: 225 lb (102 kg; 16 st 1 lb)
- Position: Right wing
- Shot: Right
- Played for: Boston Bruins; Atlanta Thrashers; Winnipeg Jets; EHC München; New York Rangers
- National team: United States
- NHL draft: 5th overall, 2004; Phoenix Coyotes
- Playing career: 2008–2024

Blake James Wheeler (born August 31, 1986) is an American former professional ice hockey player. He played in the National Hockey League (NHL) for the Boston Bruins, Atlanta Thrashers/Winnipeg Jets, and New York Rangers. He was drafted by the Phoenix Coyotes in the first round, fifth overall, in the 2004 NHL entry draft. After failing to come to terms on a contract with the Coyotes, he signed with the Bruins as a free agent.

== Early life ==
Wheeler was born on August 31, 1986, in Plymouth, Minnesota to parents Pat and Jim and older sister Brooke. Growing up, Wheeler played and attended Breck School in Golden Valley, Minnesota. While playing youth hockey, Wheeler often played a year or two up from his age group due to his skills.

== Playing career ==
=== Amateur ===
While he originally attended Wayzata High School, Wheeler chose to move to Breck School for his junior and senior years in order to better his chances at a hockey scholarship. During the 2002–03 season, Wheeler helped lead the Wayzata Bantam team to the AA Silver Stick title and the Minnesota A Bantam State title. He also played three games at the Tier 1 Bantam National Championships against three triple A teams. At season's end, Wheeler had accumulated 130 points in 60 games and led the team in scoring. Following these titles, Wheeler tried out for the United States men's national junior ice hockey team but was cut before the final roster was announced. Upon being cut, Wheeler returned to Breck School for his junior season where he put up a state-high 45 goals and 55 assists during the 2003–04 regular season and playoffs. He also led his team to a Class A State Hockey Championship that season and scored a hat trick in the final game. Beyond hockey, Wheeler also played football at Breck and set a record for most catches by a tight end in the Prep Bowl. During their Class 2A championship game, Wheeler caught seven passes for 147 yards to defeat Kingsland 51–14. Following his breakout season, Wheeler committed to play for the Minnesota Golden Gophers at the University of Minnesota. While he was originally deciding between Boston College and the University of Minnesota, he ultimately chose Minnesota due to its closeness to his family. Wheeler was eventually drafted fifth overall by the Phoenix Coyotes in the 2004 NHL entry draft. This was considered an unexpected pick as Wheeler was ranked 17th among North American skaters by the NHL Central Scouting Bureau.

Wheeler left Breck after his junior year upon being drafted by the Green Bay Gamblers in the United States Hockey League (USHL) in the 2003 USHL Futures Draft. When speaking of his decision to leave Breck, Wheeler said, "I felt I had accomplished all I could at the high school level, and wanted to test myself against bigger and older players." Wheeler immediately made an impact on the Gamblers as he scored two goals and an assist in his debut on October 9. After the team began the season going 1–6, Wheeler received a phone call from Coyotes general manager Wayne Gretzky, who gave him words of encouragement and advice. The team's slow start continued throughout the season, and Gamblers coach Mark Mazzoleni was soon fielding calls to trade Wheeler. However, Wheeler finished the 2004–05 season leading the Gamblers with 19 goals and 28 assists for 47 points.

=== College ===
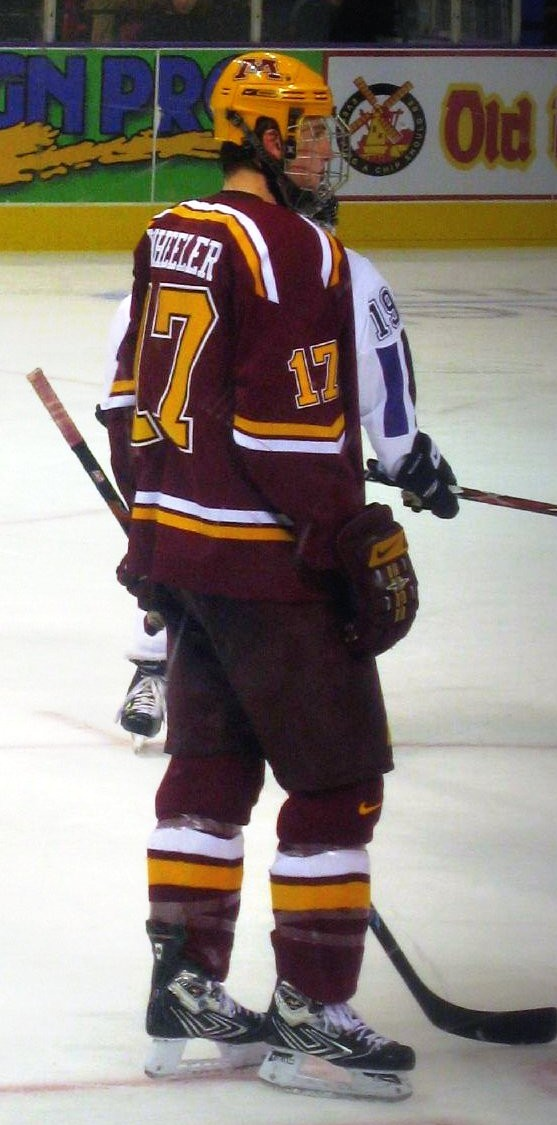
Wheeler played with the University of Minnesota from 2005 to 2008.

Following his one season with the Gamblers, Wheeler was asked to participate in USA Hockey's Under-20 National Junior Evaluation Camp before joining the Minnesota Golden Gophers for his freshman season. While attending the evaluation camp, Wheeler scored three goals and an assist over four games against other international teams. Wheeler began his freshman season with two goals and one assist for three points over his first four collegiate games. By December, he ranked tied for fourth on the Gophers with four goals and fifth in points with 10. Wheeler finished his freshman season ranked eighth on the team with 23 points and third among freshman with nine goals. Although the Gophers qualified for the 2006 NCAA Division I men's ice hockey tournament, Wheeler and the Gophers were upset by the Holy Cross Crusaders in the Regional semifinals.

When Wheeler returned to the Golden Gophers for his sophomore season, he worked with the coaching staff to learn how to become more physical on the ice. He specifically studied Tomas Holmström and Ryan Smyth to view how they played a physical game using their larger bodies. After Phil Kessel left the Gophers to join the Boston Bruins, the team began putting more responsibility on Wheeler and moved him from wing to center. Through his first five games of the 2006–07 season, Wheeler tallied three goals and two assists while also winning 50 percent of faceoffs. While playing center in between wingers Ben Gordon and Jay Barriball, Wheeler led the team with nine goals and 18 points by the end of November. Wheeler continued playing on the Gophers top line, and spent time on the team's top power play unit, as the Gophers maintained a lengthy win streak. Wheeler began to slow down during the second half of the season and despite scoring 27 points in his first 22 games, he recorded just six points from January 7 to mid-March. He finished his sophomore season with a career-high 18 goals and 20 assists to rank third on the team with 38 points over 42 games. During the 2007 WCHA Semifinals, Wheeler recorded his first collegiate hat trick to lift the Gophers to a 4–2 win over the University of Wisconsin–Madison. In their following game against the North Dakota Fighting Sioux, Wheeler scored the game-winning goal in a 3–2 overtime win to lift the Gophers to the number one seed in the 2007 NCAA Division I men's ice hockey tournament. Wheeler was subsequently named to the All-Tournament Team and received the tournament's MVP award.

During the 2007 off-season, Wheeler participated in the Coyotes rookie camp before returning to the Gophers for the 2007–08 season. Wheeler and the Gophers began the season by clinching the programs first-ever Icebreaker Invitational title. Wheeler scored two goals during the tournament against the RPI Engineers and Michigan Wolverines. By November, Wheeler had become one of the more consistent players on the Gophers as he recorded four goals and two assists for six points over eight games. However, the Gophers were struggling to win games and had a 0–4–0 WCHA record and 4–4–0 overall record. Their losing record continued throughout the month as the Gophers were off to one of their worst starts in program history. Despite snapping his 77-game iron man streak, Wheeler continued to be a consistent player on the ice for the Gophers and was tied for the team lead with five goals and 11 points. By the time the Gophers reached their three-week holiday break, they had a 9–8–1 overall record and 5–7–0 conference record. Upon returning from the holiday break, Wheeler continued to find his scoring stride and continued to lead the Gophers in scoring with 12 goals and 10 assists for 22 points through mid-January. However, the Gophers continued to lose games and had a 6–10–4 conference record through February. Despite this, the Gophers finished seventh in the regular season to clinch their eighth consecutive trip to the NCAA tournament with a 19–16–9 overall record. While Wheeler finished with 15 goals and 19 assists, he was recognized with a spot on the All-WCHA Third Team.

At the end of the season, four years after he was drafted, Wheeler had yet to come to a contract agreement with the Coyotes. Given the option, Wheeler elected to become an unrestricted free agent despite a maximum entry-level contract offer from the club.

=== Professional ===
==== Boston Bruins (2008–2011) ====
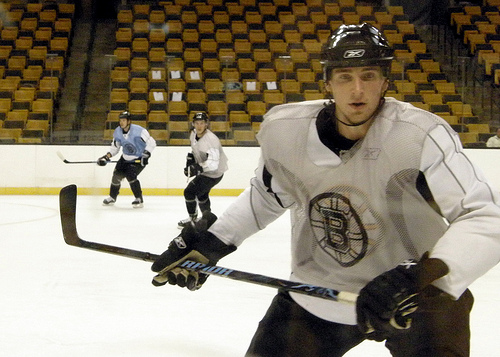
Wheeler practicing with the Boston Bruins in November 2008.

After the Phoenix Coyotes were not able to come to terms with Wheeler, on July 1, 2008, Wheeler signed an entry-level contract with the Boston Bruins. The Coyotes received a compensatory second-round pick as a result of his signing elsewhere. After attending the Bruins Development Camp, Wheeler was named to their 2008–09 opening night roster. While playing on a line with David Krejčí and Chuck Kobasew, Wheeler scored his first career NHL goal in Boston's season-opening 5-4 win against the Colorado Avalanche on October 9, 2008. On November 6, Wheeler changed his jersey number from 42 to 26 as it was a common number worn among his University of Minnesota teammates. In his first game with his new number, Wheeler recorded his first career NHL hat trick, which was against the Toronto Maple Leafs. As a result of his on-ice success, Wheeler was named to the 2009 NHL YoungStars Game to represent the rookies against the sophomores. During the tournament, he scored four goals to beat the sophomores 9–5 and earn Game MVP honors. As a mainstay winger on a line with Krejčí and Michael Ryder, Wheeler accumulated 36 points through his first 61 NHL games. However, his scoring prowess began sliding in March and after going eight games without a goal, he earned his first healthy scratch on March 7, 2009. Following the scratch, Wheeler added 4 goals in the remaining 16 games. As the Bruins qualified for the 2009 Stanley Cup playoffs, Wheeler finished the regular season seventh in rookie scoring with 21 goals and 24 assists for 45 points through 81 games. He also ranked second behind Krejčí among all NHL players with a plus 36 rating. Wheeler struggled during the Bruins' playoff run, going scoreless in eight games while registering only four shots on goal. As such, he was scratched for Game 5 of their Eastern Conference semifinal series against the Carolina Hurricanes.

Wheeler spent the 2009 off-season training and building muscle with the assistance of Bruins strength and conditioning coach John Whitesides. He returned to the team's training camp ahead of the 2009–10 season weighing 205 pounds, 10 pounds heavier than his rookie season weight. Despite the added weight and muscle, Wheeler was optimistic that it would not impact his skating or playmaking abilities. He played in his 100th career NHL game on November 1 against the Pittsburgh Penguins. By the end of the month, Wheeler was tied for second on the team with seven goals and tied for third with 14 points. Although he would experience a lengthy scoring drought in December, Wheeler continued to build on his sophomore season with 12 goals and 28 points through his first 47 games. During another lengthy drought in March, Wheeler was moved off his line with Krejčí and Ryder onto a line centered by Vladimír Sobotka and winger Miroslav Šatan. As the Bruins qualified for the 2010 Stanley Cup playoffs, Wheeler and Ryder were the only two Bruins to appear in all 82 games of the regular season. Despite this, Wheeler failed to match his previous seasons prowess and concluded his sophomore season with 18 goals and 20 assists for 38 points. During the playoffs, Wheeler played on a line with Marc Savard and Michael Ryder while also appearing on some of their special team units. He scored his first career playoff goal and added an assist in Game 1 of the Eastern Conference semifinals against the Philadelphia Flyers. He finished the postseason with one goal and five assists for six points over 13 games.

As Wheeler and the Bruins were unable to come to a contract agreement at the end of the 2009–10 season, the team engaged in contract arbitration which ultimately resulted in a one-year contract worth US$2.2 million. Although he had played wing for the majority of his time in Boston, head coach Claude Julien spoke of moving Wheeler to a center position during the 2010–11 season. Following an injury to David Krejčí in early November, Wheeler was moved up in the Bruins lineup to center a line with Mark Recchi and rookie Jordan Caron. However, he returned to his usual wing position once Krejčí returned. On February 18, 2011, Wheeler and Mark Stuart were traded to the Atlanta Thrashers in exchange for Boris Valábik and Rich Peverley. At the time of the trade, Wheeler had accumulated 11 goals over 58 games and was fit to become a restricted free agent at the season's end.

==== Atlanta Thrashers / Winnipeg Jets (2011–2023) ====
Upon joining the Thrashers, Wheeler recorded 17 points over 23 games while averaging nearly 19 minutes of ice time per game. On July 18, 2011, Wheeler signed a two-year, $5.1 million deal after the Thrashers were relocated and renamed the Winnipeg Jets. In the inaugural 2011–12 season with the Jets, he led the team in scoring with a career-high 64 points in 80 games. With the 2012–13 season delayed due to the NHL lockout, and in order to keep game shape, Wheeler signed in Europe with EHC München of the Deutsche Eishockey Liga (DEL) in Germany on October 28, 2012.

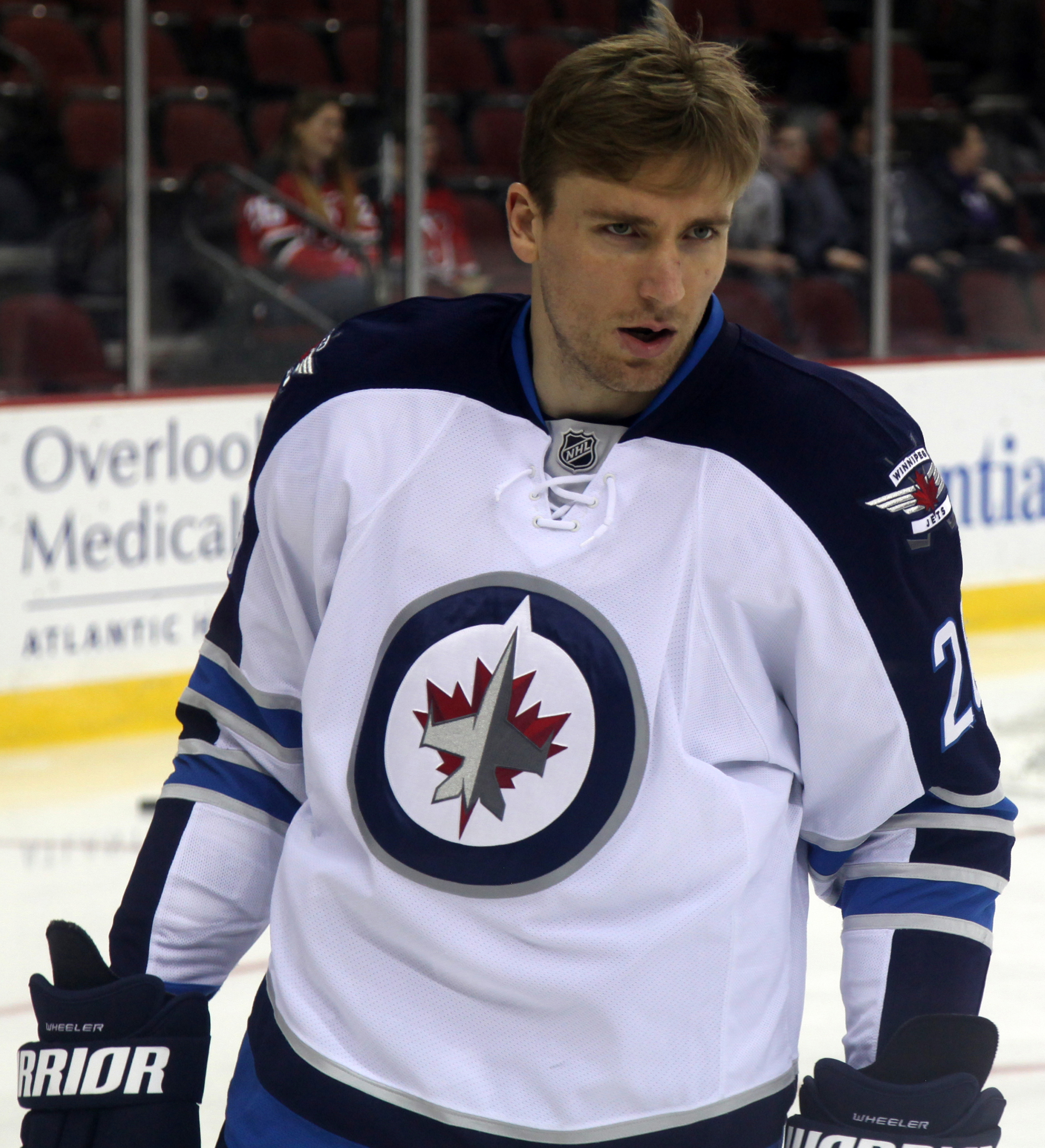
Wheeler with the Jets in November 2013

In July 2013, Wheeler avoided arbitration by signing a contract for six years, $33.6 million, which carried an annual cap hit of $5.6 million per season. He became the third-highest paid Jets player behind defensemen Tobias Enström and Dustin Byfuglien, and he was signed through to the 2018–19 season. On August 31, 2016, Wheeler was named the new team captain of the Jets. Wheeler was named to his first NHL All-Star game on January 10, 2018, for the 2018 NHL All-Star Game, finished the regular season with a career best 91 points and tied for the league lead in assists at 68 with Claude Giroux. On April 24, 2018, Wheeler was named a finalist for the Mark Messier Leadership Award.

On September 4, 2018, Wheeler signed a five-year, $41.25 million contract extension with the Jets.

On December 5, 2021, Wheeler played his 1,000th NHL game.

On September 16, 2022, the Jets stripped Wheeler of the captaincy, choosing to go without a captain for the 2022–23 season. On July 1, 2023, Wheeler was bought out by the Jets. Wheeler's tenure ended as the franchise's all-time leader in points (812) and assists, and third in goals behind only Ilya Kovalchuk and Mark Scheifele. His franchise points record was surpassed on October 18, 2025, when Scheifele recorded his 813th career point in a home game against the Nashville Predators. Additionally, Blake Wheeler was the last player remaining on the team from the franchise's tenure in Atlanta.

==== New York Rangers (2023–2024) ====
On July 1, 2023, as a free agent, Wheeler signed a one-year deal with the New York Rangers worth $800,000 with another $300,000 in potential bonuses. Wheeler played 54 games for the Rangers in 2023–24 regular season, recording nine goals and 12 assists, before being placed on injured reserve list after injuring his leg on February 15, 2024, against the Montreal Canadiens.

Wheeler went unsigned by any of the 32 NHL teams ahead of the 2024–25 NHL season but opted against retirement, remaining active as an unrestricted free agent. He officially announced his retirement on July 16, 2025.

== Personal life ==
Wheeler and his wife Sam have three children together.

== Career statistics ==
=== Regular season and playoffs ===
Bold indicates led league

			Regular season					Playoffs
Season	Team	League	GP	G	A	Pts	PIM	GP	G	A	Pts	PIM
2002–03	Breck School	HS-MN	26	15	27	42	—	—	—	—	—	—
2003–04	Breck School	HS-MN	27	39	50	89	34	3	6	5	11	0
2004–05	Green Bay Gamblers	USHL	58	19	28	47	43	—	—	—	—	—
2005–06	University of Minnesota	WCHA	39	9	14	23	41	—	—	—	—	—
2006–07	University of Minnesota	WCHA	44	18	20	38	42	—	—	—	—	—
2007–08	University of Minnesota	WCHA	44	15	20	35	72	—	—	—	—	—
2008–09	Boston Bruins	NHL	81	21	24	45	46	8	0	0	0	0
2009–10	Boston Bruins	NHL	82	18	20	38	53	13	1	5	6	6
2010–11	Boston Bruins	NHL	58	11	16	27	32	—	—	—	—	—
2010–11	Atlanta Thrashers	NHL	23	7	10	17	14	—	—	—	—	—
2011–12	Winnipeg Jets	NHL	80	17	47	64	55	—	—	—	—	—
2012–13	EHC München	DEL	15	6	14	20	51	—	—	—	—	—
2012–13	Winnipeg Jets	NHL	48	19	22	41	28	—	—	—	—	—
2013–14	Winnipeg Jets	NHL	82	28	41	69	63	—	—	—	—	—
2014–15	Winnipeg Jets	NHL	79	26	35	61	73	4	1	0	1	2
2015–16	Winnipeg Jets	NHL	82	26	52	78	49	—	—	—	—	—
2016–17	Winnipeg Jets	NHL	82	26	48	74	47	—	—	—	—	—
2017–18	Winnipeg Jets	NHL	81	23	**68**	91	52	17	3	18	21	10
2018–19	Winnipeg Jets	NHL	82	20	71	91	60	6	1	4	5	6
2019–20	Winnipeg Jets	NHL	71	22	43	65	37	4	0	1	1	5
2020–21	Winnipeg Jets	NHL	50	15	31	46	50	8	2	3	5	0
2021–22	Winnipeg Jets	NHL	65	17	43	60	36	—	—	—	—	—
2022–23	Winnipeg Jets	NHL	72	16	39	55	46	5	2	4	6	0
2023–24	New York Rangers	NHL	54	9	12	21	23	1	0	0	0	2
NHL totals			1,172	321	622	943	764	66	10	35	45	31

=== International ===
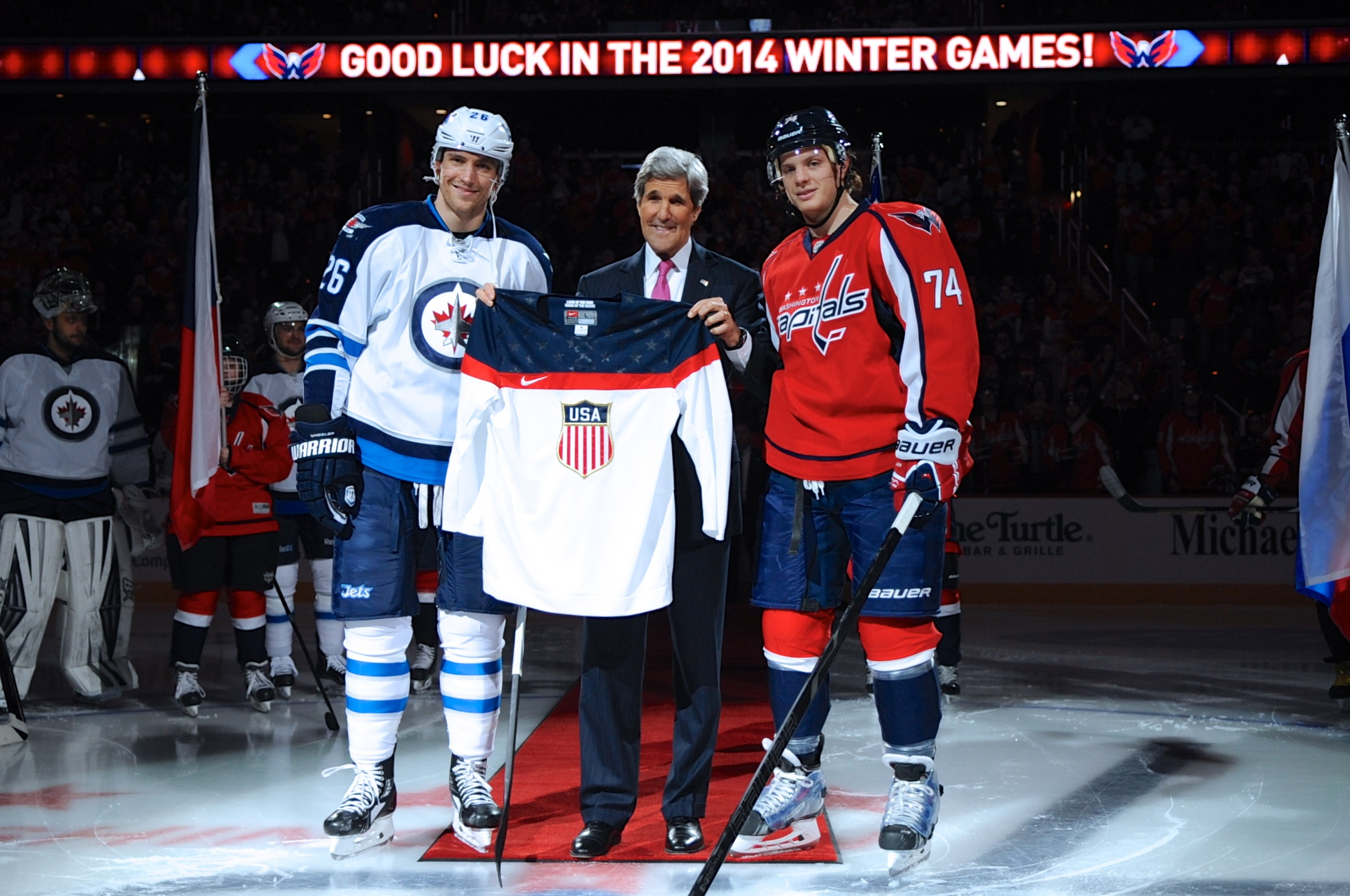
Wheeler (left) with U.S. Secretary of State John Kerry and John Carlson in a ceremony for American-bound Olympians to the 2014 Winter Olympics. Both Carlson and Wheeler were members of Team USA in 2014.

Year	Team	Event	Result	GP	G	A	Pts	PIM
2006	United States	WJC	4th	7	2	0	2	6
2011	United States	WC	8th	7	2	3	5	6
2014	United States	OG	4th	6	0	1	1	2
2016	United States	WCH	7th	3	0	1	1	0
Junior totals				7	2	0	2	6
Senior totals				16	2	5	7	8

== Awards and honors ==
Award	Year
College
WCHA All-Tournament Team	2007
All-WCHA Third Team	2007–08
NHL
NHL YoungStars Game	2009
NHL YoungStars MVP	2009
NHL All-Star	2018, 2019
NHL second All-Star team	2018

== See also ==
- List of NHL players with 1,000 games played

Awards and achievements
Preceded by Jordan Parise	WCHA Most Valuable Player in Tournament; 2007	Succeeded by Alex Kangas
Preceded by Ben Eager	Phoenix Coyotes first-round draft pick 2004	Succeeded by Martin Hanzal
Sporting positions
Preceded by Andrew Ladd	Winnipeg Jets captain 2016–2022	Succeeded by Adam Lowry
