= Taylor Chorney =

Canadian-American ice hockey player (born 1987)

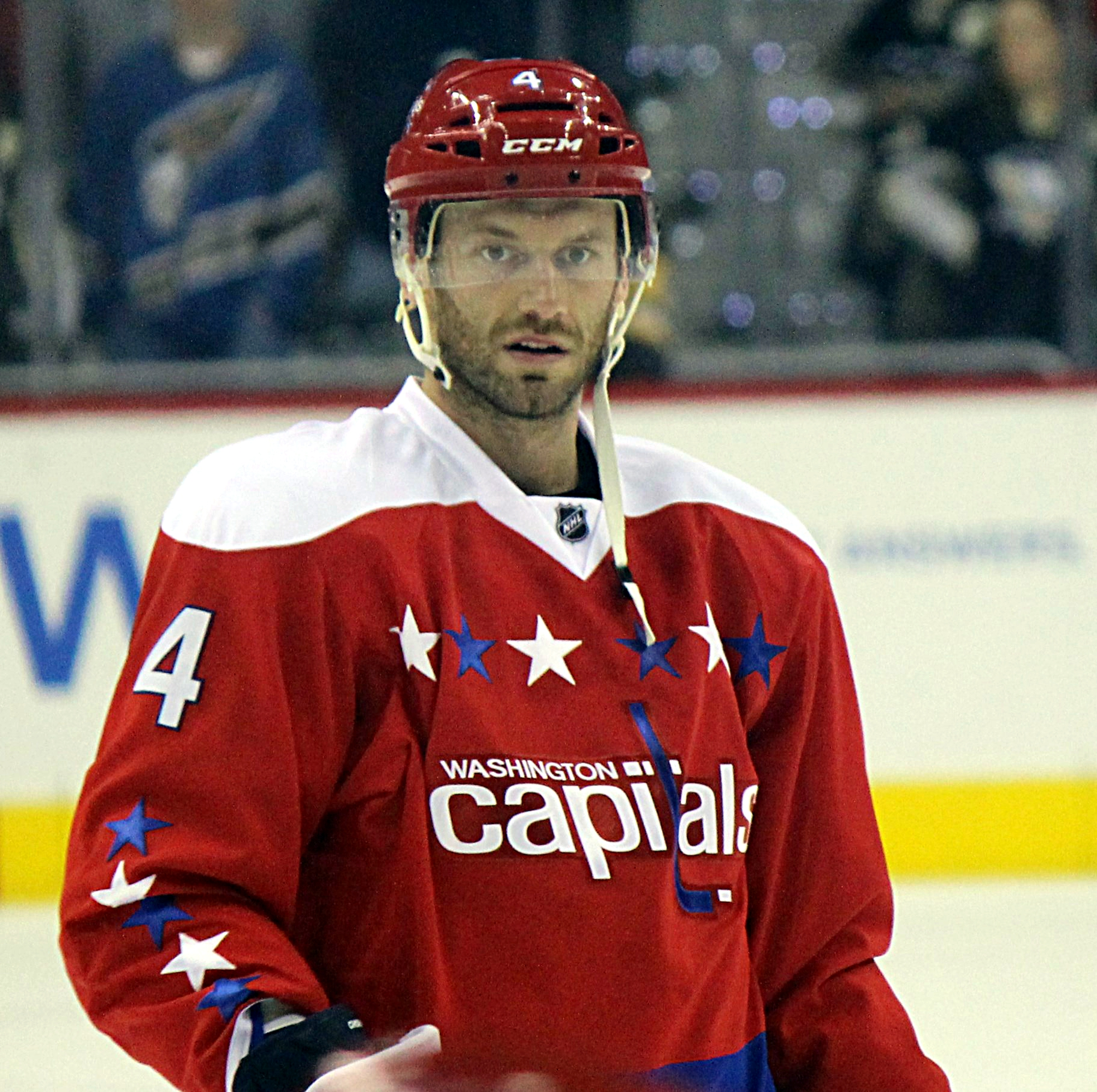
- Chorney with the Capitals in 2016.
- Born: April 27, 1987 (age 39) Thunder Bay, Ontario, Canada
- Height: 6 ft 1 in (185 cm)
- Weight: 189 lb (86 kg; 13 st 7 lb)
- Position: Defence
- Shot: Left
- Played for: Edmonton Oilers; St. Louis Blues; Pittsburgh Penguins; Washington Capitals; Columbus Blue Jackets; HC Lugano; EC Red Bull Salzburg
- National team: United States
- NHL draft: 36th overall, 2005; Edmonton Oilers
- Playing career: 2008–2021

Taylor Chorney (born April 27, 1987) is a Canadian-born American former professional ice hockey player. A defenceman, he played parts of eight seasons in the National Hockey League (NHL) for the Edmonton Oilers, St. Louis Blues, Pittsburgh Penguins, Washington Capitals, and Columbus Blue Jackets.

== Playing career ==
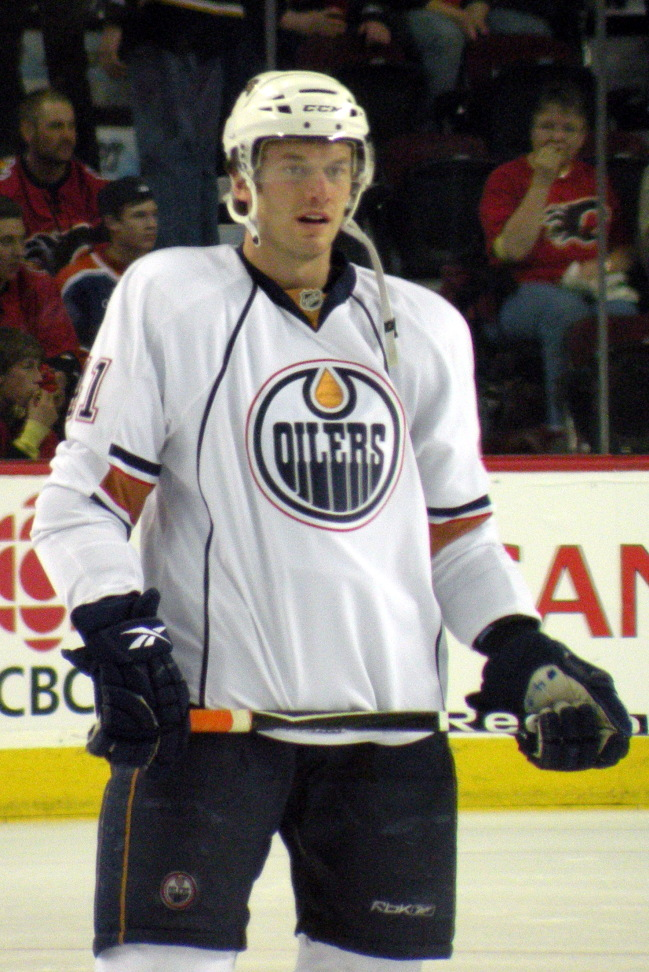
Chorney with the Oilers in 2009.

Prior to being drafted by the Edmonton Oilers with the 36th overall pick in the 2005 NHL entry draft, Chorney previously played at the University of North Dakota. He also was on Team USA at the 2006 World Junior Championships. Chorney represented the USA again in the 2007 World Juniors, where he was team captain.

Chorney made his NHL debut on April 10, 2009, against the Calgary Flames. He recorded his first NHL point in his first game of the 2009–10 season, by assisting one of Zack Stortini's two goals on October 12, 2009, on the road against the Nashville Predators. Taylor Chorney scored his first NHL goal against the Dallas Stars on February 15, 2011, at Rexall Place.

On October 10, 2011, Chorney was placed on waivers with the purpose of being assigned with the Oklahoma City Barons. On October 11, 2011, Chorney was claimed off of waivers by the St. Louis Blues. After only two games with the Blues on November 10, 2011, he was again waived and was re-claimed by the Edmonton Oilers.

On July 1, 2012, Chorney signed a one-year, two-way deal as a free agent to return to the St. Louis Blues.

On July 1, 2014, Chorney joined his third NHL club, in signing a one-year two way contract with the Pittsburgh Penguins. Chorney spent the majority of the 2014–15 season with AHL affiliate, the Wilkes-Barre/Scranton Penguins, however appeared in 7 games with Pittsburgh on recall.

On the first day of free agency, Chorney was signed to a one-year contract with the Washington Capitals on July 1, 2015. After appearing in 24 games during the 2017–18 season Chorney was placed on waivers by the Capitals on February 20, 2018, and was claimed by the Columbus Blue Jackets the following day. Chorney remained on the Blue Jackets roster, however frequented as a healthy scratch. He appeared in just 1 game with the Blue Jackets to end the season. Although he did not finish the season with the Capitals and ultimately missed out on being on the roster for Washington's Stanley Cup championship, he was awarded a Stanley Cup ring by his former teammates.

As a free agent, Chorney left the NHL after 8 seasons in agreeing to an optional two-year contract with the Swiss HC Lugano of the NL, on July 7, 2018. On April 8, 2019, Lugano activated Chorney's option for a second season with the team. For 2020–21, Chorney signed with EC Red Bull Salzburg of the IceHL.

Chorney retired from professional hockey after the conclusion of the 2020–21 IceHL season.

== Personal life ==
Chorney was born in Thunder Bay, Ontario, but grew up in Hastings, Minnesota, and has dual citizenship to Canada and the United States, as he was born to a Canadian father and an American mother.

His father, Marc, played 210 games in the NHL for the Pittsburgh Penguins and Los Angeles Kings. He has a younger brother, Marcus Chorney, who previously played hockey at Shattuck St. Mary's prep school and Quinnipiac University.

== Career statistics ==
=== Regular season and playoffs ===
			Regular season					Playoffs
Season	Team	League	GP	G	A	Pts	PIM	GP	G	A	Pts	PIM
2003–04	Shattuck–Saint Mary's	HS–Prep	74	12	44	56	58	—	—	—	—	—
2004–05	Shattuck–Saint Mary's	HS–Prep	50	4	30	34	52	—	—	—	—	—
2004–05	U.S. NTDP U18	USDP	11	1	2	3	12	—	—	—	—	—
2005–06	University of North Dakota	WCHA	44	3	15	18	54	—	—	—	—	—
2006–07	University of North Dakota	WCHA	39	8	23	31	48	—	—	—	—	—
2007–08	University of North Dakota	WCHA	43	3	21	24	24	—	—	—	—	—
2008–09	Springfield Falcons	AHL	68	5	16	21	22	—	—	—	—	—
2008–09	Edmonton Oilers	NHL	2	0	0	0	0	—	—	—	—	—
2009–10	Springfield Falcons	AHL	32	4	9	13	14	—	—	—	—	—
2009–10	Edmonton Oilers	NHL	42	0	3	3	12	—	—	—	—	—
2010–11	Oklahoma City Barons	AHL	46	3	13	16	22	—	—	—	—	—
2010–11	Edmonton Oilers	NHL	12	1	3	4	4	—	—	—	—	—
2011–12	St. Louis Blues	NHL	2	0	0	0	0	—	—	—	—	—
2011–12	Oklahoma City Barons	AHL	50	6	18	24	29	10	0	1	1	6
2011–12	Edmonton Oilers	NHL	3	0	0	0	0	—	—	—	—	—
2012–13	Peoria Rivermen	AHL	73	4	20	24	37	—	—	—	—	—
2013–14	Chicago Wolves	AHL	69	5	20	25	37	9	1	1	2	2
2014–15	Wilkes–Barre/Scranton Penguins	AHL	62	4	15	19	42	6	1	1	2	6
2014–15	Pittsburgh Penguins	NHL	7	0	0	0	0	5	0	0	0	2
2015–16	Washington Capitals	NHL	55	1	5	6	21	7	0	1	1	4
2016–17	Washington Capitals	NHL	18	1	4	5	11	—	—	—	—	—
2017–18	Washington Capitals	NHL	24	1	3	4	8	—	—	—	—	—
2017–18	Columbus Blue Jackets	NHL	1	0	0	0	0	—	—	—	—	—
2018–19	HC Lugano	NL	48	5	20	25	40	4	0	0	0	4
2019–20	HC Lugano	NL	42	1	12	13	22	—	—	—	—	—
2020–21	EC Red Bull Salzburg	ICEHL	34	4	10	14	20	11	0	1	1	2
AHL totals			400	31	111	142	203	25	2	3	5	14
NHL totals			166	4	18	22	56	12	0	1	1	6

=== International ===
Medal record

Representing United States

World Junior Championships
Bronze medal – third place	2007 Sweden	

World Junior U18 Championships
Gold medal – first place	2005 Czech Republic	

Year	Team	Event	Result	GP	G	A	Pts	PIM
2005	United States	WJC18	1st place, gold medalist(s)	6	1	0	1	8
2006	United States	WJC	4th	7	0	0	0	6
2007	United States	WJC	3rd place, bronze medalist(s)	7	1	5	6	4
2010	United States	WC	13th	6	0	0	0	2
Junior totals				20	2	5	7	18
Senior totals				6	0	0	0	2

== Awards and honors ==
Award	Year
College
All-WCHA Second Team	2006–07
AHCA West Second-Team All-American	2006–07
WCHA All-Tournament Team	2007, 2008
All-WCHA First Team	2007–08
