= Bryan McGregor =

British–Canadian ice hockey player

- Born: June 27, 1984 (age 41) Niagara Falls, Ontario, Canada
- Height: 5 ft 11 in (180 cm)
- Weight: 195 lb (88 kg; 13 st 13 lb)
- Position: Right wing/Centre
- Shoots: Right
- CEL team: HC Oceláři Třinec
- NHL draft: Undrafted
- Playing career: 2007–present

Bryan McGregor (born June 27, 1984) is a Canadian professional ice hockey player.

== Career ==
McGregor played with HC Oceláři Třinec in the Czech Extraliga for parts of the 2010–11 and 2011–12 seasons. In mid-October 2011, McGregor was acquired with cash by Energie Karlovy Vary for Petr Gřegořek. However, the trade was voided due to an injury McGregor sustained.

== Personal life ==
McGregor was born to Scottish emigrants Michael McGregor and Margaret (Trusdale) McGregor. He has one sister, Maegan. McGregor was in a short-term relationship with 2005 winner of Miss Canada International, Nicole Kostrosky. He speaks English, French, Czech, and Russian, the third of which he learned while playing with HC Oceláři Třinec.
