= 2006–07 NCAA Division I men's ice hockey rankings =

- NCAA tournament: 2007
- NCAA champion: Michigan State
- Preseason No. 1 (USA Today): Boston College
- Preseason No. 1 (USCHO): Wisconsin
- NCAA Division I men's ice hockey rankings

Two human polls made up the 2006–07 NCAA Division I men's ice hockey rankings, the USCHO.com/CSTV Division I Men's Poll and the USA TODAY/USA Hockey Magazine Poll. As the 2006–07 season progressed, rankings were updated weekly. There were a total of 34 voters in the USA Today poll and 40 voters in the USCHO.com poll. Each first place vote in the USA Today poll is worth 15 points in the rankings while a first place vote in the USCHO.com poll is worth 20 points with every subsequent vote worth 1 fewer point in either poll.

== Legend ==
	Increase in ranking
	Decrease in ranking
	Not ranked previous week
(Italics)	Number of first place votes
#–#–#	Win–loss–tie record
†	Tied with team above or below also with this symbol

== USA TODAY/USA Hockey Magazine Poll ==
	Preseason Oct 2	Week 1 Oct 9	Week 2 Oct 16	Week 3 Oct 23	Week 4 Oct 30	Week 5 Nov 6	Week 6 Nov 13	Week 7 Nov 20	Week 8 Nov 27	Week 9 Dec 4	Week 10 Dec 11	Week 11 Dec 18	Week 12 Jan 8	Week 13 Jan 15	Week 14 Jan 22	Week 15 Jan 29	Week 16 Feb 5	Week 17 Feb 12	Week 18 Feb 19	Week 19 Feb 26	Week 20 Mar 5	Week 21 Mar 12	Week 22 Mar 19	Week 23 Mar 26	Final Apr 9	
1	Boston College (19)	Boston College (19) 0–0–0	Boston College (29) 1–0–0	Maine (31) 5–0–0	Maine (34) 6–0–0	Maine (34) 7–0–1	Minnesota (16) 8–1–2	Minnesota (34) 10–1–2	Minnesota (34) 12–1–2	Minnesota (28) 13–1–3	Minnesota (34) 15–1–3	Minnesota (34) 15–1–3	Minnesota (34) 19–1–3	Minnesota (30) 20–2–3	Minnesota (33) 21–3–3	New Hampshire (31) 19–4–1	Notre Dame (20) 23–5–2	Notre Dame (20) 24–5–3	Notre Dame (21) 26–5–3	Notre Dame (14) 27–6–3	Notre Dame (33) 27–6–3	Notre Dame (32) 29–6–3	Notre Dame (27) 31–6–3	Boston College (26) 28–11–1	Michigan State (33) 26–13–3	1
2	Minnesota (2)	Wisconsin (15) 1–0–1	Wisconsin (4) 2–1–1	Wisconsin (2) 3–1–2	Minnesota; 6–1–0	Minnesota; 8–1–0	Maine (18) 8–1–1	Maine; 8–2–1	New Hampshire; 9–2–1	New Hampshire (6) 11–2–1	New Hampshire; 13–2–1	New Hampshire; 13–2–1	Maine; 14–3–2	New Hampshire (4) 17–3–1	New Hampshire (1) 18–4–1	Notre Dame (3) 21–5–2	Minnesota (9) 23–5–3	Minnesota (7) 23–5–3	Minnesota (13) 25–5–3	St. Cloud State (16) 20–6–6	Minnesota (1) 26–8–3	Minnesota (2) 28–9–3	Minnesota (7) 30–9–3	North Dakota (8) 24–13–5	Boston College; 29–12–1	2
3	Wisconsin (11)	Michigan State; 0–0–0	North Dakota (1) 3–1–0	Minnesota; 4–1–0	Boston College; 4–1–0	Boston College; 5–2–0	North Dakota; 6–3–1	Miami; 10–4–0	Maine; 8–3–1	Maine; 9–3–1	Maine; 10–3–1	Notre Dame; 14–3–1	New Hampshire; 16–3–1	Notre Dame; 19–4–1	Notre Dame; 20–5–1	Minnesota; 21–5–3	New Hampshire (5) 20–5–1	New Hampshire (7) 22–5–1	New Hampshire; 22–6–2	New Hampshire; 23–7–2	St. Cloud State; 20–7–7	New Hampshire; 25–9–2	Clarkson; 25–8–5	Minnesota; 31–10–3	North Dakota; 24–14–5	3
4	Michigan State	North Dakota; 2–0–0	Maine; 3–0–0	Boston University; 2–0–1	Miami; 6–2–0	Miami; 7–3–0	Michigan State; 5–2–1	Boston College; 7–3–1	Miami; 11–5–0	Miami; 13–5–0	Notre Dame; 14–3–1	Miami; 14–5–1	St. Cloud State; 14–3–3	Denver; 17–7–2	St. Cloud State; 16–4–4	St. Cloud State; 17–5–4	St. Cloud State; 17–5–4	St. Cloud State; 18–5–5	Boston University; 17–5–9	Minnesota (4) 25–7–3	Clarkson; 21–8–5	St. Cloud State; 22–8–7	Boston College; 26–11–1	Notre Dame; 32–7–3	Notre Dame (1) 32–7–3	4
5	Boston University (2)	Michigan; 0–0–0	Michigan; 2–0–0	Boston College; 2–1–0	Michigan State; 3–1–0	Michigan State; 4–2–0	Miami; 8–4–0	Notre Dame; 9–2–1	Notre Dame; 10–3–1	Notre Dame; 12–3–1	Miami; 14–5–1	Maine; 10–3–2	Notre Dame; 17–4–1	Maine; 14–5–2	Denver; 18–8–2	Denver; 19–9–2	Denver; 20–10–2	Michigan State; 18–8–3	St. Cloud State; 18–6–6	Boston University; 18–6–9	New Hampshire; 23–9–2	Clarkson; 23–8–5	New Hampshire; 26–10–2	Michigan State; 24–13–3	Minnesota; 31–10–3	5
6	Michigan	Boston University; 0–0–0	Boston University; 0–0–1	Michigan; 3–1–0	North Dakota; 5–3–0	North Dakota; 6–3–1	Notre Dame; 8–1–1	Michigan State; 6–3–1	Michigan; 11–4–0	Boston College; 8–4–1	St. Cloud State; 10–3–3	St. Cloud State; 10–3–3	Miami; 16–7–1	St. Cloud State; 14–4–4	Boston University; 12–4–6	Boston University; 13–5–7	Michigan State; 17–8–2	Boston University; 15–5–8	Clarkson; 20–7–5	Denver; 21–12–3	Boston College; 22–11–1	Boston College; 24–11–1	North Dakota; 22–13–5	Maine; 23–14–2	Maine; 23–15–2	6
7	North Dakota	Maine; 1–0–0	Minnesota; 2–1–0	Miami; 4–2–0	Wisconsin; 3–3–2	Wisconsin; 4–4–2	Boston College; 6–3–0	Michigan; 9–3–0	Boston College; 7–4–1	Michigan; 12–5–0	Boston College; 9–5–1	Boston College; 9–5–1	Boston College †; 10–6–1	Boston College; 12–6–1	Maine; 15–6–2	Michigan State; 16–8–1	Boston University; 13–5–8	Maine; 19–8–2	Denver; 20–11–3	Clarkson; 21–8–5	North Dakota; 19–12–5	North Dakota; 21–12–5	St. Cloud State; 22–10–7	New Hampshire; 26–11–2	Clarkson; 25–9–5	7
8	Miami	Minnesota; 0–1–0	Michigan State; 1–1–0	New Hampshire; 2–0–0	Boston University; 2–1–1	Boston University; 2–1–3	Michigan; 7–3–0	New Hampshire; 7–2–1	Denver; 9–4–1	St. Cloud State; 8–3–3	Boston University; 6–3–5	Colorado College; 11–6–1	Denver †; 15–7–2	Boston University; 10–4–6	Michigan State; 16–8–1	Clarkson; 16–6–4	Michigan; 21–9–0	Denver; 20–11–3	North Dakota; 17–11–4	North Dakota; 18–12–4	Boston University; 18–7–9	Boston University; 20–8–9	Michigan; 26–13–1	Clarkson; 25–9–5	St. Cloud State; 22–11–7	8
9	Denver	Vermont; 2–0–0	Miami; 3–1–0	North Dakota; 3–3–0	Michigan; 4–2–0	Notre Dame; 6–1–1	Boston University; 2–1–4	North Dakota; 6–5–1	Boston University; 5–2–4	Colorado College; 10–5–1	Colorado College; 11–6–1	Boston University; 6–3–5	Clarkson; 13–5–1	Miami; 17–8–1	Miami; 18–8–2	Maine; 16–7–2	Maine; 17–8–2	Clarkson; 19–7–4	Miami; 22–10–4	Maine; 21–10–2	Miami; 23–11–4	Michigan; 25–12–1	Boston University; 20–9–9	Massachusetts; 21–13–5	New Hampshire; 26–11–2	9
10	New Hampshire	Miami; 1–1–0	Vermont; 2–0–1	Michigan State; 1–1–0	Notre Dame; 5–1–0	Michigan; 5–3–0	New Hampshire; 5–2–1	Boston University; 3–2–4	North Dakota; 7–6–1	North Dakota; 7–6–1	Cornell; 8–3–1	Michigan †; 12–7–0	Michigan State; 12–8–1	Clarkson; 13–5–3	Clarkson; 14–6–3	Michigan; 19–9–0	Clarkson; 17–7–4	Michigan; 21–10–1	Michigan; 22–11–1	Miami; 23–11–4	Denver; 21–13–4	St. Lawrence; 22–12–2	Michigan State; 22–13–3	Michigan; 26–14–1	Michigan; 26–14–1	10
11	Maine	Harvard; 0–0–0	Denver; 2–2–0	Notre Dame; 3–1–0	Cornell; 2–0–0	Cornell †; 4–0–0	Denver; 6–4–0	Denver; 7–4–1	St. Cloud State; 6–3–3	Boston University; 5–3–5	Michigan; 12–7–0	Denver †; 12–6–2	Colorado College; 13–8–1	Michigan State; 14–8–1	Michigan; 17–9–0	Miami; 18–9–3	North Dakota; 15–11–2	Miami; 20–10–4	Maine; 19–10–2	Boston College; 20–11–1	Michigan; 23–12–1	Michigan State; 21–12–3	St. Lawrence; 23–13–2	St. Cloud State; 22–11–7	Miami; 24–14–4	11
12	Harvard	Denver; 1–1–0	New Hampshire; 0–0–0	Harvard; 0–0–0	Dartmouth; 2–0–0	Clarkson †; 6–1–1	Cornell; 5–1–0	Cornell; 6–2–0	Michigan State; 6–6–1	Cornell; 8–3–1	Denver; 10–6–2	Cornell; 8–3–1	Boston University; 8–4–6	Colorado College; 14–9–1	Vermont; 14–8–2	North Dakota; 15–11–2	Miami; 18–10–4	North Dakota; 16–11–3	Boston College; 18–11–1	Michigan; 23–12–1	St. Lawrence; 20–12–2	Massachusetts; 20–11–5	Massachusetts; 20–12–5	Miami; 24–14–4	Massachusetts; 21–13–5	12
13	Colorado College	New Hampshire; 0–0–0	Harvard; 0–0–0	Denver; 3–3–0	Clarkson; 4–1–1	New Hampshire; 4–2–0	Wisconsin; 4–6–2	St. Cloud State; 4–3–3	Cornell; 7–3–0	Denver; 9–6–1	Vermont; 9–5–1	Vermont; 10–5–1	Michigan; 13–8–0	Michigan; 15–9–0	Colorado College; 14–9–1	Boston College; 14–9–1	Colorado College; 16–10–2	Boston College; 16–10–1	Michigan State; 18–11–3	St. Lawrence; 20–12–2	Michigan State; 19–12–3	Miami; 23–13–4	Miami; 23–13–4	Boston University; 20–10–9	Boston University; 20–10–9	13
14	Colgate	Colorado College; 2–0–0	Clarkson; 3–0–1	Clarkson; 4–1–1	New Hampshire; 2–2–0	Denver; 4–4–0	Dartmouth; 4–2–0	Massachusetts; 6–1–1	Alaska; 6–2–4	Michigan State; 7–7–1	Michigan State; 9–7–1	Michigan State; 9–7–1	Cornell; 9–5–1	Vermont; 12–8–2	Boston College; 12–8–1	Vermont; 14–8–4	Vermont; 15–9–4	Colorado College; 16–11–3	St. Lawrence; 19–11–2	Michigan State; 19–12–3	Massachusetts; 18–11–5	Dartmouth; 18–10–3	Maine; 21–14–2	St. Lawrence; 23–14–2	St. Lawrence; 23–14–2	14
15	Cornell	Cornell; 0–0–0	St. Cloud State; 1–1–0	Cornell; 0–0–0	Michigan Tech; 5–1–0	Alaska-Anchorage; 3–3–2	St. Cloud State; 2–3–3	Dartmouth †; 5–3–0	Yale; 6–2–1	Vermont; 9–5–1	Clarkson; 11–5–1	Clarkson; 11–5–1	Lake Superior State; 13–6–3	Cornell; 9–6–2	North Dakota; 13–11–2	Niagara; 17–8–3	Boston College; 15–10–1	St. Lawrence; 17–11–2	Colorado College; 16–13–3	Vermont; 17–13–4	Maine; 21–12–2	Denver; 21–15–4	Denver; 21–15–4	Denver; 21–15–4	Denver; 21–15–4	15
16								Northern Michigan †; 7–6–2																		16
	Preseason Oct 2	Week 1 Oct 9	Week 2 Oct 16	Week 3 Oct 23	Week 4 Oct 30	Week 5 Nov 6	Week 6 Nov 13	Week 7 Nov 20	Week 8 Nov 27	Week 9 Dec 4	Week 10 Dec 11	Week 11 Dec 18	Week 12 Jan 8	Week 13 Jan 15	Week 14 Jan 22	Week 15 Jan 29	Week 16 Feb 5	Week 17 Feb 12	Week 18 Feb 19	Week 19 Feb 26	Week 20 Mar 5	Week 21 Mar 12	Week 22 Mar 19	Week 23 Mar 26	Final Apr 9	
		Dropped: Colgate; 0–2–0	Dropped: Colorado College; 3–0–1; Cornell; 0–0–0	Dropped: Vermont; 2–2–1; St. Cloud State; 2–2–0	Dropped: Harvard; 0–1–0; Denver; 4–4–0	Dropped: Dartmouth; 2–2–0; Michigan Tech; 5–3–0	Dropped: Clarkson; 6–3–1; Alaska-Anchorage; 4–4–2	Dropped: Wisconsin; 4–8–2	Dropped: Massachusetts; 6–3–1; Dartmouth; 5–3–2; Northern Michigan; 7–6–2	Dropped: Alaska; 6–4–4; Yale; 6–4–1	Dropped: North Dakota; 7–8–1	Dropped: None	Dropped: Vermont; 11–8–1	Dropped: Lake Superior State; 13–8–3	Dropped: Cornell; 9–7–3	Dropped: Colorado College; 14–10–2	Dropped: Niagara; 17–10–3	Dropped: Vermont; 15–11–4	Dropped: None	Dropped: Colorado College; 16–15–3	Dropped: Vermont; 17–14–5	Dropped: Maine; 21–14–2	Dropped: Dartmouth; 18–12–3	Dropped: None	Dropped: None	

== USCHO.com/CSTV Division I Men's Poll ==
	Preseason Sep 25	Week 1 Oct 9	Week 2 Oct 16	Week 3 Oct 23	Week 4 Oct 30	Week 5 Nov 6	Week 6 Nov 13	Week 7 Nov 20	Week 8 Nov 27	Week 9 Dec 4	Week 10 Dec 11	Week 11 Dec 18	Week 12 Jan 2	Week 13 Jan 8	Week 14 Jan 15	Week 15 Jan 22	Week 16 Jan 29	Week 17 Feb 5	Week 18 Feb 12	Week 19 Feb 19	Week 20 Feb 26	Week 21 Mar 5	Week 22 Mar 12	Week 23 Mar 19	
1	Wisconsin (17)	Boston College (14) 0–0–0	Boston College (31) 1–0–0	Maine (34) 5–0–0	Maine (37) 6–0–0	Maine (36) 7–0–1	Maine (22) 8–1–1	Minnesota (39) 10–1–2	Minnesota (40) 12–1–2	Minnesota (36) 13–1–3	Minnesota (40) 15–1–3	Minnesota (40) 15–1–3	Minnesota (40) 17–1–3	Minnesota (40) 19–1–3	Minnesota (35) 20–2–3	Minnesota (36) 21–3–3	New Hampshire (36) 19–4–1	Notre Dame (17) 23–5–2	Notre Dame (19) 24–5–3	Notre Dame (25) 26–5–3	Notre Dame (20) 27–6–3	Notre Dame (36) 27–6–3	Notre Dame (31) 29–6–3	Notre Dame (24) 31–6–3	1
2	Boston College (10)	Wisconsin (12) 1–0–1	Wisconsin (3) 2–1–1	Wisconsin (3) 3–1–2	Minnesota (1) 6–1–0	Minnesota (4) 8–1–0	Minnesota (17) 8–1–2	Maine (1) 8–2–1	New Hampshire; 9–2–1	New Hampshire (4) 11–2–1	New Hampshire; 13–2–1	New Hampshire; 13–2–1	Notre Dame; 16–3–1	Maine; 14–3–2	New Hampshire (5) 17–3–1	New Hampshire (4) 18–4–1	Notre Dame (1) 21–5–2	Minnesota (12) 23–5–3	Minnesota (9) 23–5–3	Minnesota (14) 25–5–3	St. Cloud State (15) 20–6–6	Minnesota (4) 26–8–3	Minnesota (9) 28–9–3	Minnesota (13) 30–9–3	2
3	Minnesota (5)	Boston University (2) 0–0–0	North Dakota (4) 3–1–0	Minnesota (2) 4–1–0	Boston College (2) 4–1–0	Boston College; 5–2–0	North Dakota; 6–3–1	Miami; 10–4–0	Maine; 8–3–1	Maine; 9–3–1	Maine; 10–3–1	Notre Dame; 14–3–1	Maine; 12–3–2	New Hampshire; 16–3–1	Notre Dame; 19–4–1	Notre Dame; 20–5–1	Minnesota (3) 21–5–3	New Hampshire (11) 20–5–1	New Hampshire (12) 22–5–1	New Hampshire (12) 22–6–2	New Hampshire (2) 23–7–2	St. Cloud State; 20–7–7	New Hampshire; 25–9–2	Clarkson; 25–8–5	3
4	Boston University (3)	Michigan State; 0–0–0	Maine; 3–0–0	Boston University; 2–0–1	Miami; 6–2–0	Miami; 7–3–0	Michigan State; 5–2–1	Notre Dame; 9–2–1	Miami; 11–5–0	Miami; 13–5–0	Notre Dame; 14–3–1	Miami; 14–5–1	New Hampshire; 14–3–1	St. Cloud State; 14–3–3	Maine; 14–5–2	St. Cloud State; 16–4–4	St. Cloud State; 17–5–4	St. Cloud State; 17–5–4	St. Cloud State; 18–5–5	St. Cloud State; 18–6–6	Minnesota (3) 25–7–3	New Hampshire; 23–9–2	St. Cloud State; 22–8–7	Boston College; 26–11–1	4
5	Michigan State (1)	North Dakota (2) 2–0–0	Michigan (1) 2–0–0	Boston College; 2–1–0	Wisconsin; 3–3–2	North Dakota; 6–3–1	Notre Dame (1) 8–1–1	Boston College; 7–3–1	Notre Dame; 10–3–1	Notre Dame; 12–3–1	Miami; 14–5–1	Maine; 10–3–2	St. Cloud State; 12–3–3	Notre Dame; 17–4–1	Denver; 17–7–2	Denver; 18–8–2	Denver; 19–9–2	Denver; 20–10–2	Maine; 19–8–2	Boston University; 17–5–9	Boston University; 18–6–9	Clarkson; 21–8–5	Clarkson; 23–8–5	New Hampshire; 26–10–2	5
6	North Dakota (1)	Michigan (1) 0–0–0	Boston University; 0–0–1	Michigan (1) 3–1–0	Michigan State; 3–1–0	Michigan State; 4–2–0	Miami; 8–4–0	Michigan State; 6–3–1	Michigan; 11–4–0	Boston College; 8–4–1	St. Cloud State; 10–3–3	St. Cloud State; 10–3–3	Miami; 15–6–1	Miami; 16–7–1	St. Cloud State; 14–4–4	Maine; 15–6–2	Michigan State; 16–8–1	Michigan State; 17–8–2	Michigan State; 18–8–3	Clarkson; 20–7–5	Clarkson; 21–8–5	North Dakota; 19–12–5	North Dakota; 21–12–5	North Dakota; 22–13–5	6
7	Michigan (2)	Maine; 1–0–0	Minnesota; 2–1–0	Miami; 4–2–0	Boston University; 2–1–1	Wisconsin; 4–4–2	Boston College; 6–3–0	Michigan; 9–3–0	Boston College; 7–4–1	Michigan; 12–5–0	Boston College; 9–5–1	Boston College; 9–5–1	Boston College; 9–5–1	Denver; 15–7–2	Boston College; 12–6–1	Boston University; 12–4–6	Boston University; 13–5–7	Maine; 17–8–2	Boston University; 15–5–8	Denver; 20–11–3	Denver; 21–12–3	Boston College; 22–11–1	Boston College; 24–11–1	St. Cloud State; 22–10–7	7
8	Miami	Minnesota; 0–1–0	Michigan State; 1–1–0	New Hampshire; 2–0–0	North Dakota; 5–3–0	Boston University; 2–1–3	Michigan; 7–3–0	New Hampshire; 7–2–1	Denver; 9–4–1	St. Cloud State; 8–3–3	Colorado College; 11–6–1	Colorado College; 11–6–1	Denver; 14–6–2	Boston College; 10–6–1	Boston University; 10–4–6	Miami; 18–8–2	Clarkson; 16–6–4	Boston University; 13–5–8	Denver; 20–11–3	North Dakota; 17–11–4	North Dakota; 18–12–4	Boston University; 18–7–9	Boston University; 20–8–9	Michigan; 26–13–1	8
9	Denver	Miami; 1–1–0	Miami; 3–1–0	Michigan State; 1–1–0	Michigan; 4–2–0	Notre Dame; 6–1–1	Boston University; 2–1–4	North Dakota; 6–5–1	Boston University; 5–2–4	Colorado College; 10–5–1	Boston University; 6–3–5	Boston University; 6–3–5	Clarkson; 13–5–1	Clarkson; 13–5–1	Miami; 17–8–1	Michigan State; 16–8–1	Maine; 16–7–2	Michigan; 21–9–0	Clarkson; 19–7–4	Miami; 22–10–4	Boston College; 20–11–1	Miami; 23–11–4	Michigan; 25–12–1	Boston University; 20–9–9	9
10	New Hampshire	Vermont (1) 2–0–0	Vermont; 2–0–1	North Dakota; 3–3–0	Notre Dame; 5–1–0	Michigan; 5–3–0	New Hampshire; 5–2–1	Denver; 7–4–1	St. Cloud State; 6–3–3	North Dakota; 7–6–1	Michigan; 12–7–0	Denver; 12–6–2	Michigan State; 11–7–1	Michigan State; 12–8–1	Clarkson; 13–5–3	Clarkson; 14–6–3	Miami; 18–9–3	Clarkson; 17–7–4	North Dakota; 16–11–3	Michigan; 22–11–1	Miami; 23–11–4	Michigan; 23–12–1	Michigan State; 21–12–3	Michigan State; 22–13–3	10
11	Maine	Denver; 1–1–0	Denver; 2–2–0	Harvard; 0–0–0	Dartmouth; 2–0–0	Cornell; 4–0–0	Denver; 6–4–0	Boston University; 3–2–4	North Dakota; 7–6–1	Boston University; 5–3–5	Cornell; 8–3–1	Michigan; 12–7–0	Cornell; 9–4–1	Colorado College; 13–8–1	Michigan State; 14–8–1	Vermont; 14–8–2	Michigan; 19–9–0	North Dakota; 15–11–2	Michigan; 21–10–1	Boston College; 18–11–1	Maine; 21–10–2	Denver; 21–13–4	St. Lawrence; 22–12–2	St. Lawrence; 23–13–2	11
12	Harvard	Harvard; 0–0–0	New Hampshire; 0–0–0	Notre Dame; 3–1–0	Cornell; 2–0–0	Clarkson; 6–1–1	Cornell; 5–1–0	Cornell; 6–2–0	Michigan State; 6–6–1	Cornell; 8–3–1	Denver; 10–6–2	Cornell; 8–3–1	Colorado College; 12–7–1	Boston University; 8–4–6	Colorado College; 14–9–1	Michigan; 17–9–0	North Dakota; 15–11–2	Miami; 18–10–4	Miami; 20–10–4	Maine; 19–10–2	Michigan; 23–12–1	St. Lawrence; 20–12–2	Massachusetts; 20–11–5	Massachusetts; 20–12–5	12
13	Cornell	New Hampshire; 0–0–0	Harvard; 0–0–0	Cornell; 0–0–0	New Hampshire; 2–2–0	New Hampshire; 4–2–0	Dartmouth; 4–2–0	St. Cloud State; 4–3–3	Cornell; 7–3–0	Denver; 9–6–1	Vermont; 9–5–1	Vermont; 10–5–1	Boston University; 7–4–5	Michigan; 13–8–0	Michigan; 15–9–0	Boston College; 12–8–1	Boston College; 14–9–1	Colorado College; 16–10–2	Boston College; 16–10–1	Michigan State; 18–11–3	St. Lawrence; 20–12–2	Michigan State; 19–12–3	Miami; 23–13–4	Miami; 23–13–4	13
14	Colgate (1)	Cornell; 0–0–0	Cornell; 0–0–0	Denver; 3–3–0	Clarkson; 4–1–1	Denver; 4–4–0	Wisconsin; 4–6–2	Massachusetts; 6–1–1	Alaska; 6–2–4	Vermont; 9–5–1	Michigan State; 9–7–1	Michigan State; 9–7–1	Michigan; 13–8–0	Cornell; 9–5–1	Vermont; 12–8–2	Colorado College; 14–9–1	Vermont; 14–8–4	Vermont; 15–9–4	Colorado College; 16–11–3	St. Lawrence; 19–11–2	Michigan State; 19–12–3	Maine; 21–12–2	Dartmouth; 18–10–3	Maine; 21–14–2	14
15	Colorado College	Colorado College; 2–0–0	Clarkson; 3–0–1	Clarkson; 4–1–1	Denver; 4–4–0	Alaska; 5–1–2	Northern Michigan; 6–4–2	Dartmouth; 5–3–0	Colorado College; 8–5–1	Michigan State; 7–7–1	Clarkson; 11–5–1	Clarkson; 11–5–1	Vermont; 11–6–1	Lake Superior State; 13–6–3	Cornell; 9–6–2	North Dakota; 13–11–2	Colorado College; 14–10–2	Boston College; 14–10–1	St. Lawrence; 17–11–2	Colorado College; 16–13–3	Vermont; 17–13–4	Massachusetts; 18–11–5	Denver; 21–15–4	Denver; 21–15–4	15
16	St. Cloud State	St. Cloud State; 0–0–0	Colorado College; 3–0–1	St. Cloud State; 2–2–0	Harvard; 0–1–0	St. Cloud State †; 2–3–1	Rensselaer; 4–1–3	Alaska; 5–2–3	Yale; 6–2–1	Massachusetts; 7–3–2	Massachusetts; 8–5–2	Massachusetts; 8–5–2	Quinnipiac; 8–4–4	Bemidji State; 12–5–3	Quinnipiac; 11–6–4	Niagara; 15–8–3	Niagara; 17–8–3	St. Lawrence; 15–11–2	Vermont; 15–11–4	Cornell; 14–9–4	Massachusetts; 16–11–5	Colorado College; 17–15–4	Michigan Tech; 18–16–5	Quinnipiac; 21–14–5	16
17	Ohio State	Clarkson; 2–0–0	St. Cloud State; 1–1–0	Dartmouth; 0–0–0	St. Cloud State; 2–2–0	Northern Michigan †; 5–4–1	St. Cloud State; 2–3–3	Yale; 6–1–0	Dartmouth; 5–3–2	Clarkson; 10–5–1	North Dakota; 7–8–1	Quinnipiac; 8–4–4	Lake Superior State; 12–6–2	Niagara; 13–6–3	Lake Superior State; 13–8–3	St. Lawrence; 12–9–2	St. Lawrence; 14–10–2	Massachusetts; 13–9–4	Niagara; 17–10–3	Vermont; 16–12–4	Colorado College; 16–15–3	Dartmouth; 16–10–3	Maine; 21–14–2	Wisconsin; 19–18–4	17
18	Dartmouth	Dartmouth; 0–0–0	Dartmouth; 0–0–0	Northern Michigan; 3–2–1	Michigan Tech; 5–1–0	Rensselaer; 3–1–3	Clarkson; 6–3–1	Northern Michigan; 7–6–2	Vermont; 7–4–1	Dartmouth; 5–3–2	Lake Superior State; 11–5–2	Lake Superior State; 11–5–2	Bemidji State; 10–5–3	Vermont; 11–8–1	North Dakota; 11–11–2	Cornell; 9–7–3	Quinnipiac; 12–8–4	Niagara; 17–10–3	Cornell; 12–9–4	Massachusetts; 14–11–5	Michigan Tech; 15–14–5	Michigan Tech; 16–15–5	Quinnipiac; 20–13–5	Dartmouth; 18–12–3	18
19	Northern Michigan	Ohio State; 0–0–0	Nebraska-Omaha; 0–0–2	Vermont; 2–2–1	Northern Michigan; 4–3–1	Dartmouth; 2–2–0	Alaska; 5–2–3	Colorado College; 7–4–1	Massachusetts; 6–3–1	Alaska; 6–4–4	Dartmouth; 5–3–2	Alaska; 7–5–4	Niagara; 11–6–3	Quinnipiac; 9–5–4	St. Lawrence; 11–9–1	Lake Superior State; 13–10–3	Massachusetts; 12–8–4	Quinnipiac; 13–9–4	Massachusetts; 13–10–5	Wisconsin; 14–15–3	Dartmouth; 16–10–3	Vermont; 17–14–5	Colorado College; 18–17–4	Michigan Tech; 18–17–5	19
20	Clarkson	Northern Michigan; 0–1–1	Colgate; 2–2–0	Colorado College; 3–2–1	Nebraska-Omaha; 3–1–2	Colorado College; 5–4–1	Massachusetts; 5–1–1	Quinnipiac; 7–3–2	Northern Michigan; 7–6–2	Lake Superior State; 10–5–1	Quinnipiac; 8–4–4	Dartmouth; 5–4–2	North Dakota; 9–10–1	North Dakota; 10–11–1	Niagara; 13–8–3	Quinnipiac; 11–8–4	Cornell; 10–8–3	Cornell; 11–9–3	Quinnipiac; 14–10–5	Quinnipiac; 16–11–5	Cornell; 14–11–4	Cornell; 14–11–4	Wisconsin; 17–17–4	Colorado College; 18–17–4	20
	Preseason Sep 25	Week 1 Oct 9	Week 2 Oct 16	Week 3 Oct 23	Week 4 Oct 30	Week 5 Nov 6	Week 6 Nov 13	Week 7 Nov 20	Week 8 Nov 27	Week 9 Dec 4	Week 10 Dec 11	Week 11 Dec 18	Week 12 Jan 1	Week 13 Jan 8	Week 14 Jan 15	Week 15 Jan 22	Week 16 Jan 29	Week 17 Feb 5	Week 18 Feb 12	Week 19 Feb 19	Week 20 Feb 26	Week 21 Mar 5	Week 22 Mar 12	Week 23 Mar 19	
		Dropped: Colgate; 0–2–0	Dropped: Ohio State; 1–1–0; Northern Michigan; 1–2–1	Dropped: Nebraska-Omaha; 1–1–2; Colgate; 2–2–0	Dropped: Vermont; 2–3–1; Colorado College; 3–4–1	Dropped: Harvard; 0–3–0; Michigan Tech; 5–3–0; Nebraska-Omaha; 3–2–3	Dropped: Colorado College; 5–4–1	Dropped: Wisconsin; 4–8–2; Rensselaer; 4–2–3; Clarkson; 6–5–1	Dropped: Quinnipiac; 7–4–3	Dropped: Yale; 6–4–1; Northern Michigan; 7–8–2	Dropped: Alaska; 7–5–4	Dropped: North Dakota; 7–10–1	Dropped: Massachusetts; 8–6–3; Alaska; 7–7–4; Dartmouth; 5–6–2	Dropped: None	Dropped: Bemidji State; 12–7–3	Dropped: None	Dropped: Lake Superior State; 14–11–3	Dropped: None	Dropped: None	Dropped: Niagara; 17–11–4	Dropped: Wisconsin; 14–17–3; Quinnipiac; 16–13–5	Dropped: None	Dropped: Vermont; 18–16–5; Cornell; 14–13–4	Dropped: None	
