= 2006–07 NCAA Division I men's ice hockey season =

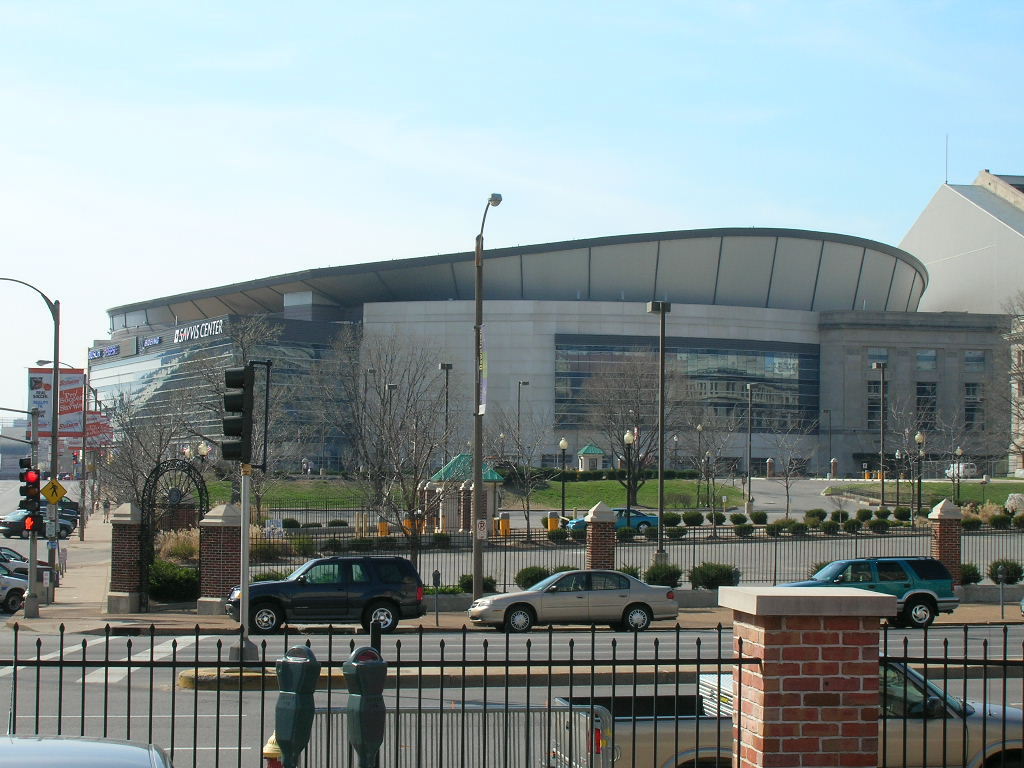
- The Scottrade Center in St. Louis, Missouri hosted the 2007 Frozen Four
- Duration: October 2006– April 7, 2007
- NCAA tournament: 2007
- National championship: Scottrade Center; St. Louis, Missouri
- NCAA champion: Michigan State
- Hobey Baker Award: Ryan Duncan (North Dakota)

The 2006–07 NCAA Division I men's ice hockey season began in = October 2006 and ended with the 2007 NCAA Division I men's ice hockey tournament's championship game on April 7, 2007, at the Scottrade Center in St. Louis, Missouri. Michigan State won the NCAA Division I Men's Ice Hockey Championship, defeating Boston College 3–1 in the national championship game. This was the 60th season in which an NCAA ice hockey championship was held and is the 113th year overall where an NCAA school fielded a team.

== Season Outlook ==
=== Pre-season polls ===
The top teams in the nation as ranked before the start of the season.

The U.S. College Hockey Online/College Sports Television poll was voted on by coaches, media, and NHL scouts. The USA Today/USA Hockey Magazine poll was voted on by coaches and media.

USCHO Poll
Rank	Team
1	Wisconsin (17)
2	Boston College (10)
3	Minnesota (5)
4	Boston University (3)
5	Michigan State (1)
6	North Dakota (1)
7	Michigan (2)
8	Miami
9	Denver
10	New Hampshire
11	Maine
12	Harvard
13	Cornell
14	Colgate (1)
15	Colorado College
16	St. Cloud State
17	Ohio State
18	Dartmouth
19	Northern Michigan
20	Clarkson

USA Today Poll
Rank	Team
1	Boston College (19)
2	Minnesota (2)
3	Wisconsin (11)
4	Michigan State
5	Boston University (2)
6	Michigan
7	North Dakota
8	Miami
9	Denver
10	New Hampshire
11	Maine
12	Harvard
13	Colorado College
14	Colgate
15	Cornell

== Regular season ==
=== Season tournaments ===
Tournament	Dates	Teams	Champion
Ice Breaker Tournament	October 6–7	4	Vermont
Nye Frontier Classic	October 13–14	4	Alaska–Anchorage
Mutual of Omaha Stampede	October 20–21	4	Northern Michigan
Lightning College Hockey Classic	October 27–28	4	Notre Dame
Governor's Cup	October 28–29	4	Rensselaer
College Hockey Showcase	November 24–25	4	N/A
Rensselaer Holiday Tournament	November 26–27	4	Niagara
Badger Showdown	December 29–30	4	Clarkson
Catamount Cup	December 29–30	4	St. Cloud State
Denver Cup	December 29–30	4	Denver
Ledyard Bank Classic	December 29–30	4	North Dakota
Dodge Holiday Classic	December 29–30	4	Minnesota
Florida College Classic	December 29–30	4	Maine
Great Lakes Invitational	December 29–30	4	Michigan State
Ohio Hockey Classic	December 29–30	4	Ohio State
UConn Hockey Classic	December 29–30	4	Colgate
Beanpot	February 5, 12	4	Boston University

=== Standings ===
2006–07 Atlantic Hockey standings
	Conference							Overall					
	GP	W	L	T	PTS	GF	GA	GP	W	L	T	GF	GA
RIT†^	28	20	7	1	41	116	71	34	21	11	2	132	93
Sacred Heart	28	17	7	4	38	91	74	36	21	11	4	118	99
Army	28	15	8	5	35	82	69	34	17	12	5	94	87
Connecticut	28	15	11	2	32	90	89	36	16	18	2	108	126
Air Force*	28	13	10	5	31	94	70	40	19	16	5	132	107
Holy Cross	28	9	14	5	23	87	94	35	10	20	5	96	123
Bentley	28	11	17	0	22	75	101	35	12	22	1	90	136
Mercyhurst	28	9	15	4	22	98	106	35	9	20	6	114	134
Canisius	28	9	16	3	21	76	95	35	9	23	3	86	130
American International	28	7	20	1	15	68	108	34	8	25	1	74	134
Championship: Air Force † indicates conference regular season champion * indicates conference tournament champion^ RIT was ineligible for the postseason Final rankings: USA Today/USA Hockey Magazine Top 15 Poll

2006–07 Central Collegiate Hockey Association standings
	Conference							Overall					
	GP	W	L	T	PTS	GF	GA	GP	W	L	T	GF	GA
#4 Notre Dame†*	28	21	4	3	45	90	51	42	32	7	3	143	70
#10 Michigan	28	18	9	1	37	119	85	41	26	14	1	174	129
#11 Miami	28	16	8	4	36	93	70	42	24	14	4	135	107
#1 Michigan State	28	15	10	3	33	81	65	42	26	13	3	137	102
Nebraska–Omaha	28	13	11	4	30	100	85	42	18	16	8	153	128
Western Michigan	28	14	13	1	29	85	93	37	18	18	1	120	126
Ohio State	28	12	12	4	28	89	86	37	15	17	5	120	120
Lake Superior State	28	11	14	3	25	65	74	43	21	19	3	111	110
Ferris State	28	10	16	2	22	70	92	39	14	22	3	107	126
Northern Michigan	28	10	17	1	21	66	80	41	15	24	2	96	123
Alaska	28	7	16	5	19	70	90	39	11	22	6	100	128
Bowling Green	28	5	22	1	11	51	108	38	7	29	2	75	147
Championship: Notre Dame † indicates conference regular season champion * indicates conference tournament champion Final rankings: USA Today/USA Hockey Magazine Top 15 Poll

2006–07 College Hockey America standings
	Conference							Overall					
	GP	W	L	T	PTS	GF	GA	GP	W	L	T	GF	GA
Niagara†	20	9	5	6	24	70	62	37	18	13	6	126	128
Bemidji State	20	9	6	5	23	56	54	33	14	14	5	97	109
Robert Morris	20	9	10	1	19	67	72	35	14	19	2	110	129
Wayne State	20	8	10	2	18	64	63	35	12	21	2	97	125
Alabama–Huntsville*	20	7	11	2	16	63	69	36	13	20	3	112	137
Championship: Alabama–Huntsville † indicates conference regular season champion * indicates conference tournament champion Final rankings: USA Today/USA Hockey Magazine Top 15 Poll

2006–07 ECAC Hockey standings
	Conference							Overall					
	GP	W	L	T	PTS	GF	GA	GP	W	L	T	GF	GA
#14 St. Lawrence†	22	16	5	1	33	73	55	39	23	14	2	122	104
#7 Clarkson*	22	13	4	4	30	74	53	39	25	9	5	136	93
Dartmouth	22	12	7	3	27	69	60	33	18	12	3	105	93
Cornell	22	10	8	4	24	64	55	31	14	13	4	90	78
Quinnipiac	22	10	8	4	24	74	63	40	21	14	5	140	106
Harvard	22	10	10	2	22	67	65	33	14	17	2	88	90
Princeton	22	10	10	2	22	69	63	34	15	16	3	102	100
Colgate	22	7	12	3	17	53	60	40	15	21	4	100	105
Rensselaer	22	6	11	5	17	55	84	36	10	18	8	88	130
Yale	22	8	13	1	17	56	72	31	11	17	3	78	98
Brown	22	6	12	4	16	65	69	32	11	15	6	96	95
Union	22	7	14	1	15	54	74	36	14	19	3	103	119
Championship: Clarkson † indicates conference regular season champion (Cleary Cup) * indicates conference tournament champion (Whitelaw Cup); Final rankings: USA Today/USA Hockey Magazine Top 15 Poll

2006–07 Hockey East standings
	Conference							Overall					
	GP	W	L	T	PTS	GF	GA	GP	W	L	T	GF	GA
#9 New Hampshire†	27	18	7	2	38	96	62	39	26	11	2	139	89
#2 Boston College*	27	18	8	1	37	89	65	40	29	12	1	142	94
#13 Boston University	27	13	6	8	34	69	51	39	20	10	9	99	78
#12 Massachusetts	27	15	9	3	33	71	63	39	21	13	5	109	91
#6 Maine	27	14	12	1	29	80	69	40	23	15	2	133	99
Vermont	27	12	10	5	29	55	56	39	18	16	5	87	78
Northeastern	27	9	13	5	23	60	66	36	13	18	5	84	94
Providence	27	9	15	3	21	66	71	36	10	23	3	76	108
Massachusetts–Lowell	27	7	16	4	18	51	76	36	8	21	7	74	104
Merrimack	27	3	22	2	8	28	86	34	3	27	4	37	111
Championship: Boston College † indicates conference regular season champion * indicates conference tournament champion Final rankings: USA Today/USA Hockey Magazine Top 15 Poll

2006–07 Western Collegiate Hockey Association standings
	Conference							Overall					
	GP	W	L	T	PTS	GF	GA	GP	W	L	T	GF	GA
#5 Minnesota†*	28	18	7	3	39	91	67	44	31	10	3	139	89
#8 St. Cloud State	28	14	7	7	35	89	70	40	22	11	7	127	99
#3 North Dakota	28	13	10	5	31	93	75	43	24	14	5	153	116
#15 Denver	28	13	11	4	30	73	73	40	21	15	4	107	95
Colorado College	28	13	12	3	29	79	74	39	18	17	4	111	98
Michigan Tech	28	11	12	5	27	69	64	40	18	17	5	90	87
Wisconsin	28	12	13	3	27	59	53	41	19	18	4	93	83
Minnesota State	28	10	13	5	25	81	99	38	13	19	6	106	132
Minnesota–Duluth	28	8	16	4	20	64	84	39	13	21	5	103	121
Alaska–Anchorage	28	8	19	1	17	62	101	37	13	21	3	90	124
Championship: Minnesota † indicates conference regular season champion * indicates conference tournament champion Final rankings: USA Today/USA Hockey Magazine Top 15 Poll

== 2007 NCAA tournament ==
Regional semifinals
1	Clarkson	0
4	Massachusetts	1*
East Regional
2	St. Cloud State	1
3	Maine	4
1	Notre Dame	3**
4	Alabama-Huntsville	2
Midwest Regional
2	Boston University	1
3	Michigan State	5
1	New Hampshire	1
4	Miami	2
Northeast Regional
2	Boston College	4
3	St. Lawrence	1
1	Minnesota	4
4	Air Force	3
West Regional
2	Michigan	5
3	North Dakota	8

Regional Finals
4	Massachusetts	1
3	Maine	3
1	Notre Dame	1
3	Michigan State	3
4	Miami	0
2	Boston College	4
1	Minnesota	2
3	North Dakota	3*

Frozen Four
E3	Maine	2
MW3	Michigan State	4
NE2	Boston College	6
W3	North Dakota	4

National championship
MW3	Michigan State	3
NE2	Boston College	1

Note: * denotes overtime period(s)

== Player stats ==
=== Scoring leaders ===
The following players led the league in points at the conclusion of the season.

GP = Games played; G = Goals; A = Assists; Pts = Points; PIM = Penalty minutes

Player	Class	Team	GP	G	A	Pts	PIM
T. J. Hensick	Senior	Michigan	41	23	46	69	38
Eric Ehn	Junior	Air Force	40	24	40	64	24
Kevin Porter	Junior	Michigan	41	24	34	58	16
Ryan Duncan	Sophomore	North Dakota	43	31	26	57	34
Brian Boyle	Senior	Boston College	42	19	34	53	104
Scott Parse	Senior	Nebraska–Omaha	40	24	28	52	36
T. J. Oshie	Sophomore	North Dakota	43	17	35	52	30
Andrew Cogliano	Sophomore	Michigan	38	24	26	50	12
Nathan Davis	Junior	Miami	42	21	29	50	24
Ted Cook	Sophomore	Niagara	37	32	16	48	56
Ryan Jones	Junior	Miami	42	29	19	48	88
Andrew Ramsey	Senior	Air Force	36	23	25	48	61
Erik Condra	Sophomore	Notre Dame	42	14	34	48	18

=== Leading goaltenders ===
The following goaltenders led the league in goals against average at the end of the regular season while playing at least 33% of their team's total minutes.

GP = Games played; Min = Minutes played; W = Wins; L = Losses; OT = Overtime/shootout losses; GA = Goals against; SO = Shutouts; SV% = Save percentage; GAA = Goals against average

Player	Class	Team	GP	Min	W	L	OT	GA	SO	SV%	GAA
David Brown	Senior	Notre Dame	39	2,389:40	30	6	3	63	6	.931	1.58
Joe Fallon	Junior	Vermont	34	1,996:59	17	14	3	62	6	.920	1.86
Michael Teslak	Sophomore	Michigan Tech	22	1,258:33	11	8	3	42	4	.916	2.00
John Curry	Senior	Boston University	36	2,154:20	17	10	8	72	7	.928	2.01
Kevin Regan	Junior	New Hampshire	35	2,065:55	24	9	2	71	3	.935	2.06
Brian Elliott	Senior	Wisconsin	36	2,053:16	15	17	2	72	5	.923	2.10
Kellen Briggs	Senior	Minnesota	26	1,518:37	17	7	2	54	2	.917	2.13
Ben Bishop	Sophomore	Maine	34	1,906:40	21	9	2	68	3	.923	2.14
Josh Johnson	Senior	Minnesota–Duluth	18	1,065:06	8	7	2	38	2	.922	2.14
Cory Schneider	Junior	Boston College	42	2,516:33	29	12	1	90	6	.925	2.15

== Awards ==
=== NCAA ===
Award		Recipient
Hobey Baker Memorial Award		Ryan Duncan, North Dakota
Spencer T. Penrose Award		Jeff Jackson, Notre Dame
Tournament Most Outstanding Player		Justin Abdelkader, Michigan State
National Rookie of the Year		Andreas Nödl, St. Cloud State
Derek Hines Unsung Hero Award		Dan Shribman, Dartmouth
Lowe's Senior CLASS Award		David Brown, Notre Dame
AHCA All-American Teams
East First Team	Position	West First Team
John Curry, Boston University	G	David Brown, Notre Dame
Drew Bagnall, St. Lawrence	D	Alex Goligoski, Minnesota
Reid Cashman, Quinnipiac	D	Jack Johnson, Michigan
Brian Boyle, Boston College	F	Ryan Duncan, North Dakota
David Jones, Dartmouth	F	T. J. Hensick, Michigan
Michel Léveillé, Maine	F	Jonathan Toews, North Dakota
East Second Team	Position	West Second Team
Jonathan Quick, Massachusetts	G	Bobby Goepfert, St. Cloud State
Matt Gilroy, Boston University	D	Taylor Chorney, North Dakota
Sean Sullivan, Boston University	D	Matt Hunwick, Michigan
Nick Dodge, Clarkson	F	Nathan Davis, Miami
Eric Ehn, Air Force	F	Scott Parse, Nebraska-Omaha
Trevor Smith, New Hampshire	F	Mike Santorelli, Northern Michigan

=== Atlantic Hockey ===
Award		Recipient
Player of the Year		Eric Ehn, Air Force
Best Defensive Forward		Trevor Stewart, Connecticut
Best Defenseman		Jon Landry, Holy Cross
Rookie of the Year		Al Mazur, Rochester
Regular Season Goaltending Award		Louis Menard, Rochester
Coach of the Year		Brian Riley, Army
Most Valuable Player in Tournament		Mike Phillipich, Air Force
Individual Sportsmanship		James Sixsmith, Holy Cross
Regular Season Scoring Trophy		Eric Ehn, Air Force
All-Atlantic Hockey Teams
First Team	Position	Second Team
Jason Smith, Sacred Heart	G	Josh Kassel, Army
Jon Landry, Holy Cross	D	Tim Manthey, Army
Scott Marchesi, Sacred Heart	D	Brent Patry, RIT
Eric Ehn, Air Force	F	Simon Lambert, RIT
Pierre-Luc O'Brien, Sacred Heart	F	Andrew Ramsey, Air Force
James Sixsmith, Holy Cross	F	Matt Scherer, Connecticut
Third Team	Position	Rookie Team
Louis Menard, Rochester	G	Louis Menard, Rochester
Sean Erickson, Connecticut	D	Cullen Eddy, Mercyhurst
Al Mazur, Rochester	D	Al Mazur, Rochester
Luke Flicek, Army	F	Anton Kharin, Rochester
Jeff Gumaer, Bentley	F	Josh Heidinger, Canisius
Jereme Tendler, American International	F	Owen Meyer, Army

=== CCHA ===
Awards		Recipient
Player of the Year		David Brown, Notre Dame
Best Defensive Forward		Nathan Davis, Miami
Best Defensive Defenseman		Matt Hunwick, Michigan
Best Offensive Defenseman		Jack Johnson, Michigan
Rookie of the Year		Mark Letestu, Western Michigan
Best Goaltender		David Brown, Notre Dame
Coach of the Year		Jeff Jackson, Notre Dame
Terry Flanagan Memorial Award		Tom Fritsche, Ohio State
Ilitch Humanitarian Award		Tim Cook, Michigan
Perani Cup Champion		Jeff Lerg, Michigan State
Scholar-Athlete of the Year		Michael Eickman, Nebraska-Omaha
Most Valuable Player in Tournament		David Brown, Notre Dame
All-CCHA Teams
First Team	Position	Second Team
David Brown, Notre Dame	G	Jeff Jakaitis, Lake Superior State
Jack Johnson, Michigan	D	Sean Collins, Ohio State
Matt Hunwick, Michigan	D	Derek A. Smith, Lake Superior State
T. J. Hensick, Michigan	F	Nathan Davis, Miami
Mike Santorelli, Northern Michigan	F	Kevin Porter, Michigan
Scott Parse, Nebraska-Omaha	F	Ryan Jones, Miami
Rookie Team	Position	
Riley Gill, Western Michigan	G	
Eddie Del Grosso, Nebraska-Omaha	D	
Kyle Lawson, Notre Dame	D	
Kevin Deeth, Notre Dame	F	
Mark Letestu, Western Michigan	F	
Ryan Thang, Notre Dame	F	

=== CHA ===
Award		Recipient
Player of the Year		Sean Bentivoglio, Niagara
Rookie of the Year		Chris Moran, Niagara
Coach of the Year		Dave Burkholder, Niagara
Student-Athlete of the Year		Shaun Arvai, Alabama-Huntsville
Easton Three-Star Player of the Year		Ted Cook, Niagara
Most Valuable Player in Tournament		David Nimmo, Alabama-Huntsville
All-CHA Teams
First Team	Position	Second Team
Matt Climie, Bemidji State	G	Juliano Pagliero, Niagara
Shaun Arvai, Alabama-Huntsville	D	Dan Ilakis, Wayne State
Pat Oliveto, Niagara	D	Mike Salekin, Alabama-Huntsville
Sean Bentivoglio, Niagara	F	Aaron Clarke, Robert Morris
Ted Cook, Niagara	F	Grant Selinger, Alabama-Huntsville
Travis Winter, Bemidji State	F	Les Reaney, Niagara
Rookie Team	Position	
Brett Bothwell, Wayne State	G	
Jeff Caister, Wayne State	D	
Tyler Gotto, Niagara	D	
Jared Katz, Wayne State	F	
Joey Moggach, Bemidji State	F	
Chris Moran, Niagara	F	

=== ECAC ===
Award		Recipient
Player of the Year		Drew Bagnall, St. Lawrence
Rookie of the Year		Sean Backman, Yale
		Brandon Wong, Quinnipiac
Coach of the Year		Joe Marsh, St. Lawrence
Best Defensive Forward		Kyle Rank, St. Lawrence
Best Defensive Defenseman		Drew Bagnall, St. Lawrence
Ken Dryden Award		David Leggio, Clarkson
Student-Athlete of the Year		Olivier Bouchard, Union
Most Outstanding Player in Tournament		Chris D'Alvise, Clarkson
All-ECAC Hockey Teams
First Team	Position	Second Team
David Leggio, Clarkson	G	Mark Dekanich, Colgate
	G	Alex Petizian, St. Lawrence
Reid Cashman, Quinnipiac	D	Sean Hurley, Brown
Drew Bagnall, St. Lawrence	D	Dylan Reese, Harvard
David Jones, Dartmouth	F	Tyler Burton, Colgate
Kyle Rank, St. Lawrence	F	Jeff Prough, Brown
Nick Dodge, Clarkson	F	Jesse Winchester, Colgate
Third Team	Position	Rookie Team
	G	Alex Petizian, St. Lawrence
Ben Lovejoy, Dartmouth	D	Alex Biega, Harvard
Jake Luthi, Rensselaer	D	Brendon Nash, Cornell
Sean Backman, Yale	F	Sean Backman, Yale
Byron Bitz, Cornell	F	TJ Galiardi, Dartmouth
Brandon Wong, Quinnipiac	F	Brandon Wong, Quinnipiac

=== Hockey East ===
Award		Recipient
Player of the Year		John Curry, Boston University
Rookie of the Year		Teddy Purcell, Maine
Bob Kullen Coach of the Year Award		Dick Umile, New Hampshire
Len Ceglarski Sportsmanship Award		Mike Lundin, Maine
Best Defensive Forward		Joe Rooney, Boston College
Best Defensive Defenseman		Sean Sullivan, Boston University
Three-Stars Award		John Curry, Boston University
William Flynn Tournament Most Valuable Player		Brock Bradford, Boston College
All-Hockey East Teams
First Team	Position	Second Team
John Curry, Boston University	G	Jonathan Quick, Massachusetts
Sean Sullivan, Boston University	D	Chris Murray, New Hampshire
Matt Gilroy, Boston University	D	Mike Lundin, Maine
Brian Boyle, Boston College	F	Josh Soares, Maine
Trevor Smith, New Hampshire	F	Peter MacArthur, Boston University
Michel Léveillé, Maine	F	Nathan Gerbe, Boston College
Rookie Team	Position	
Brad Thiessen, Northeastern	G	
Justin Braun, Massachusetts	D	
Mark Fayne, Providence	D	
Teddy Purcell, Maine	F	
Chad Costello, Northeastern	F	
Brayden Irwin, Vermont	F	

=== WCHA ===
Award		Recipient
Player of the Year		Ryan Duncan, North Dakota
Defensive Player of the Year		Alex Goligoski, Minnesota
Rookie of the Year		Andreas Nödl, St. Cloud State
Student-Athlete of the Year		Lee Sweatt, Colorado College
Coach of the Year		Bob Motzko, St. Cloud State
		Jamie Russell, Michigan Tech
Most Valuable Player in Tournament		Blake Wheeler, Minnesota
All-WCHA Teams
First Team	Position	Second Team
Bobby Goepfert, St. Cloud State	G	Brian Elliott, Wisconsin
Alex Goligoski, Minnesota	D	Mike Vannelli, Minnesota
Matt Niskanen, Minnesota-Duluth	D	Taylor Chorney, North Dakota
Ryan Duncan, North Dakota	F	Jonathan Toews, North Dakota
Mason Raymond, Minnesota-Duluth	F	Travis Morin, Minnesota State
Andrew Gordon, St. Cloud State	F	Kyle Okposo, Minnesota
Third Team	Position	Rookie Team
Michael-Lee Teslak, North Dakota	G	Alex Stalock, Minnesota-Duluth
Lee Sweatt, Minnesota	D	Erik Johnson, Minnesota
Steve Wagner, Minnesota State	D	Jamie McBain, Wisconsin
Andreas Nödl, St. Cloud State	F	Andreas Nödl, St. Cloud State
T. J. Oshie, North Dakota	F	Kyle Okposo, Minnesota
Ryan Dingle, Denver	F	Ryan Lasch, St. Cloud State

== 2007 NHL entry draft ==
Round	Pick	Player	College	Conference	NHL team
1	2	James van Riemsdyk ^{†}	New Hampshire	Hockey East	Philadelphia Flyers
1	3	Kyle Turris ^{†}	Wisconsin	WCHA	Phoenix Coyotes
1	12	Ryan McDonagh ^{†}	Wisconsin	WCHA	Montreal Canadiens
1	14	Kevin Shattenkirk ^{†}	Boston University	Hockey East	Colorado Avalanche
1	18	Ian Cole ^{†}	Notre Dame	CCHA	St. Louis Blues
1	21	Riley Nash ^{†}	Cornell	ECAC Hockey	Edmonton Oilers
1	22	Max Pacioretty ^{†}	Michigan	CCHA	Montreal Canadiens
1	25	Patrick White ^{†}	Minnesota	WCHA	Vancouver Canucks
1	27	Brendan Smith ^{†}	Wisconsin	WCHA	Detroit Red Wings
1	28	Nick Petrecki ^{†}	Boston College	Hockey East	San Jose Sharks
1	29	Jim O'Brien	Minnesota	WCHA	Ottawa Senators
2	35	Tommy Cross ^{†}	Boston College	Hockey East	Boston Bruins
2	38	Bill Sweatt	Colorado College	WCHA	Chicago Blackhawks
2	44	Aaron Palushaj ^{†}	Michigan	CCHA	St. Louis Blues
2	45	Colby Cohen ^{†}	Boston University	Hockey East	Colorado Avalanche
2	46	Theo Ruth ^{†}	Notre Dame	CCHA	Washington Capitals
2	50	Nico Sacchetti ^{†}	Minnesota	WCHA	Dallas Stars
2	53	Will Weber ^{†}	Miami	CCHA	Columbus Blue Jackets
2	57	Mike Hoeffel ^{†}	Minnesota	WCHA	New Jersey Devils
3	68	Jake Hansen ^{†}	Minnesota	WCHA	Columbus Blue Jackets
3	76	Jason Gregoire ^{†}	North Dakota	WCHA	New York Islanders
3	77	Alex Killorn ^{†}	Harvard	ECAC Hockey	Tampa Bay Lightning
3	81	Ryan Thang	Notre Dame	CCHA	Nashville Predators
3	84	Phil DeSimone ^{†}	New Hampshire	Hockey East	Washington Capitals
3	89	Corey Tropp ^{†}	Michigan State	CCHA	Buffalo Sabres
3	90	Louie Caporusso ^{†}	Michigan	CCHA	Ottawa Senators
4	92	Justin Vaive ^{†}	Miami	CCHA	Anaheim Ducks
4	93	Steven Kampfer	Michigan	CCHA	Anaheim Ducks
4	95	Alec Martinez	Miami	CCHA	Los Angeles Kings
4	96	Cade Fairchild ^{†}	Minnesota	WCHA	St. Louis Blues
4	99	Matt Frattin ^{†}	North Dakota	WCHA	Toronto Maple Leafs
4	101	Matt Rust ^{†}	Michigan	CCHA	Florida Panthers
4	104	Ben Winnett ^{†}	Michigan	CCHA	Toronto Maple Leafs
4	105	Brad Malone ^{†}	North Dakota	WCHA	Colorado Avalanche
4	108	Brett Bruneteau ^{†}	North Dakota	WCHA	Florida Panthers
4	113	Kent Patterson ^{†}	Minnesota	WCHA	Colorado Avalanche
4	114	Ben Ryan ^{†}	Notre Dame	CCHA	Nashville Predators
4	120	Ben Blood ^{†}	North Dakota	WCHA	Florida Panthers
5	126	Joe Lavin ^{†}	Providence	Hockey East	Chicago Blackhawks
5	128	Austin Smith ^{†}	Colgate	ECAC Hockey	Dallas Stars
5	131	John Lee ^{†}	Denver	WCHA	Florida Panthers
5	133	Joe Stejskal ^{†}	Dartmouth	ECAC Hockey	Montreal Canadiens
5	135	Paul Carey ^{†}	Boston College	Hockey East	Colorado Avalanche
5	137	Podge Turnbull ^{†}	Wisconsin	WCHA	Los Angeles Kings
5	138	Max Campbell ^{†}	Western Michigan	CCHA	New York Rangers
5	139	Brad Eidsness ^{†}	North Dakota	WCHA	Buffalo Sabres
5	142	Andrew Conboy ^{†}	Michigan State	CCHA	Montreal Canadiens
5	150	Matt Marshall ^{†}	Vermont	Hockey East	Tampa Bay Lightning
6	152	Jon Kalinski	Minnesota State	WCHA	Philadelphia Flyers
6	153	Scott Darling ^{†}	Maine	Hockey East	Phoenix Coyotes
6	154	Dan Dunn ^{†}	St. Cloud State	WCHA	Washington Capitals
6	158	Allen York ^{†}	Rensselaer	ECAC Hockey	Columbus Blue Jackets
6	159	Alain Goulet	Nebraska–Omaha	CCHA	Boston Bruins
6	166	Blake Kessel ^{†}	New Hampshire	Hockey East	New York Islanders
6	168	Carl Hagelin ^{†}	Michigan	CCHA	New York Rangers
6	173	Nick Bonino ^{†}	Boston University	Hockey East	San Jose Sharks
6	175	John Albert ^{†}	Ohio State	CCHA	Atlanta Thrashers
6	176	Taylor Matson ^{†}	Minnesota	WCHA	Vancouver Canucks
7	185	Nick Larson ^{†}	Minnesota	WCHA	Washington Capitals
7	186	C. J. Severyn ^{†}	Ohio State	CCHA	Calgary Flames
7	187	Nick Eno ^{†}	Bowling Green	CCHA	Buffalo Sabres
7	190	Trevor Nill ^{†}	Michigan State	CCHA	St. Louis Blues
7	191	Ryan Watson ^{†}	Western Michigan	CCHA	Florida Panthers
7	192	Scott Kishel ^{†}	Minnesota–Duluth	WCHA	Montreal Canadiens
7	198	Danny Hobbs ^{†}	Massachusetts	Hockey East	New York Rangers
7	199	Andrew Glass ^{†}	Boston University	Hockey East	Washington Capitals
7	201	Justin Braun	Massachusetts	Hockey East	San Jose Sharks
7	208	Bryan Rufenach ^{†}	Clarkson	ECAC Hockey	Detroit Red Wings
7	209	Drew MacKenzie ^{†}	Vermont	Hockey East	Buffalo Sabres
7	210	Justin Courtnall ^{†}	Boston University	Hockey East	Tampa Bay Lightning
7	211	Trent Vogelhuber ^{†}	Miami	CCHA	Columbus Blue Jackets

† incoming freshman

== See also ==
- 2006–07 NCAA Division III men's ice hockey season
