= Ryan Duncan (ice hockey) =

Canadian professional ice hockey forward

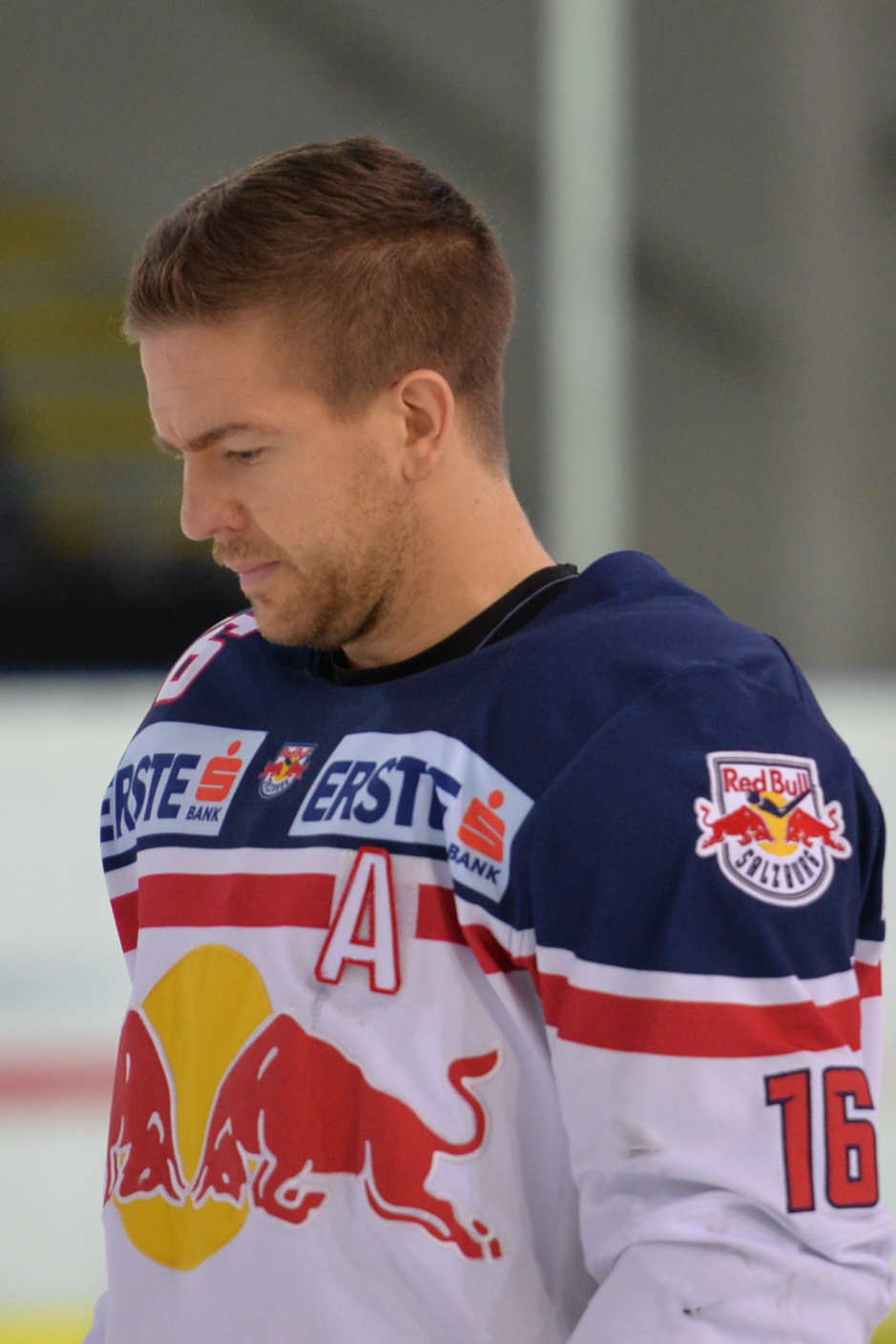
- Born: July 14, 1985 (age 40) Calgary, Alberta, Canada
- Height: 5 ft 6 in (168 cm)
- Weight: 142 lb (64 kg; 10 st 2 lb)
- Position: Forward
- Shot: Left
- Played for: Bridgeport Sound Tigers; Portland Pirates; EHC München; EC Red Bull Salzburg
- NHL draft: Undrafted
- Playing career: 2009–2019

Ryan Duncan (born July 14, 1985) is a Canadian former professional ice hockey forward. He last played for EC Red Bull Salzburg of the Austrian Hockey League (EBEL).

== Playing career ==
Duncan played four seasons with the University of North Dakota Fighting Sioux where in 2007, he won the Hobey Baker Award and was named the WCHA Player of the Year. Undrafted, Duncan signed an Amateur Tryout Contract (ATO) with the New York Islanders on April 8, 2009, and played two games for their American Hockey League affiliate, the Bridgeport Sound Tigers.

He signed with EC Red Bull Salzburg in Austria on May 12, 2009. In two seasons with Salzburg, Duncan mirrored each year in claiming the Austrian Championship and finishing as the Red Bulls second leading scorer.

On September 7, 2011, Duncan returned to North American and signed a one-year deal with AHL club, the Portland Pirates. He scored 36 points in 64 games during the 2011–12 season, but remained without an NHL offer.

On April 19, 2012, he signed a one-year contract for a second tenure in the Austrian League with EC Red Bull Salzburg.

On July 4, 2013, Duncan signed a contract in a neighbouring league in Germany, on a one-year deal with EHC Red Bull München of the Deutsche Eishockey Liga. In the 2013–14 season, Duncan established a scoring role in team and contributed with 12 goals and 32 points in 49 games.

On June 17, 2014, Duncan opted to remain within the Red Bull sponsored teams, in returning to Salzburg for a third time, on a one-year contract.

== Career statistics ==
			Regular season					Playoffs
Season	Team	League	GP	G	A	Pts	PIM	GP	G	A	Pts	PIM
2001–02	Calgary Flames Midget AAA	AMHL	36	26	31	57	32	—	—	—	—	—
2002–03	Shattuck-Saint Mary's	USHS	—	—	—	—	—	—	—	—	—	—
2003–04	Shattuck-Saint Mary's	USHS	71	62	72	134	81	—	—	—	—	—
2004–05	Salmon Arm Silverbacks	BCHL	57	48	43	91	50	—	—	—	—	—
2005–06	University of North Dakota	WCHA	46	16	20	36	26	—	—	—	—	—
2006–07	University of North Dakota	WCHA	43	31	26	57	34	—	—	—	—	—
2007–08	University of North Dakota	WCHA	43	18	22	40	51	—	—	—	—	—
2008–09	University of North Dakota	WCHA	43	20	19	39	22	—	—	—	—	—
2008–09	Bridgeport Sound Tigers	AHL	2	0	0	0	4	—	—	—	—	—
2009–10	EC Red Bull Salzburg	EBEL	50	26	32	58	34	18	7	4	11	8
2010–11	EC Red Bull Salzburg	EBEL	49	17	36	53	16	18	11	6	17	12
2011–12	Portland Pirates	AHL	64	14	22	36	24	—	—	—	—	—
2012–13	EC Red Bull Salzburg	EBEL	53	15	24	39	23	12	5	3	8	2
2013–14	EHC München	DEL	49	12	20	32	10	3	1	2	3	2
2014–15	EC Red Bull Salzburg	EBEL	52	19	30	49	12	13	5	11	16	4
2015–16	EC Red Bull Salzburg	EBEL	54	15	41	56	36	19	3	12	15	2
2016–17	EC Red Bull Salzburg	EBEL	54	9	38	47	14	11	5	5	10	4
2017–18	EC Red Bull Salzburg	EBEL	54	15	31	46	26	19	9	9	18	10
2018–19	EC Red Bull Salzburg	EBEL	52	18	29	47	30	13	6	5	11	8
EBEL totals			418	134	261	395	191	123	51	55	106	50

== Awards and honors ==
Award	Year
College
All-WCHA First Team	2007
AHCA West First-Team All-American	2007
All-WCHA Second Team	2008, 2009

Awards and achievements
Preceded by Matt Carle	WCHA Player of the Year; 2006–07	Succeeded by Richard Bachman
Preceded by Matt Carle	Winner of the Hobey Baker Award; 2006–07	Succeeded by Kevin Porter
