= 2004–05 Denver Pioneers men's ice hockey season =

Collegiate team season

NCAA Division I National Champion Denver Cup, Champion WCHA, co-Champion WCHA Tournament, Champion NCAA Tournament, Champion
- Conference: T–1st WCHA
- Home ice: Magness Arena

Rankings
- USCHO: #1
- USA Today: #1

Record
- Overall: 32–9–2
- Conference: 19–7–2
- Home: 16–4–1
- Road: 10–4–1
- Neutral: 6–1–0

Coaches and captains
- Head coach: George Gwozdecky
- Assistant coaches: Seth Appert; Steve Miller; Matt Cady
- Captain: Matt Laatsch
- Alternate captain(s): Nick Larson; Kevin Ulanski

The 2004–05 Denver Pioneers men's ice hockey season was the 56th season of play for the program and 46th in the WCHA. The Pioneers represented the University of Denver in the 2004–05 NCAA Division I men's ice hockey season, played their home games at Magness Arena and were coached by George Gwozdecky, in his 11th season. The team won the 2005 NCAA Division I men's ice hockey tournament, the 7th title in program history.

== Season ==
Denver began the defense of its first national championship in 35 years ranked #7 in the pre-season polls. While it was a fairly high ranking, the loss of several key players left the Pioneers with some significant challenges. The primary concern centered on identifying a suitable replacement for Adam Berkhoel as the starting goaltender. Coach George Gwozdecky had called him the 'best goaltender in the country' the previous year and finding his successor would be critical for the program's chances. While Edmonton draft pick Glenn Fisher had the inside track as a sophomore, training camp ended with Denver alternating between Fisher and Peter Mannino in goal.

Early results were mixed and the Pioneers got off to a sluggish start. After 10 games they sat at .500 but had faced a murderer's row of opponents. Seven of those games had come against top-6 opponents, including three consecutive weeks where Denver earned splits. Though the there were excuses as to why the Pios weren't at their top form, defeating tough competition was exactly what the team would need to do if they hoped to retain their status as champions. The defense, now led by team captain Matt Laatsch, found its consistency in November and helped the team reel off several consecutive victories. As Denver climbed towards the top of the conference standings, they similarly rose in the polls, climbing back into the top-10.

During the winter break, Denver's defense faltered a bit against Minnesota–Duluth. Fortunately, the offense had remained a strong suit for the team. The addition of Paul Stastny helped buoy the offense, led by Gabe Gauthier and Matt Carle.

After capturing the Denver Cup, the Pioneers dropped a stunner to bottom-feeding Michigan Tech. The sizable upset appeared to help refocus the team and sent Denver on another long undefeated streak. The loss to the Huskies ended up being the only defeat the Pioneers suffered over a 20-game stretch. With the platooning of Fisher and Mannino paying dividends in the win column, Denver shot to the top of the standings and earned the #1 ranking by mid-February. The Pioneers saw their streak end against Duluth but then lost the next game to Minnesota State–Mankato and fell to #3. While their ranking wasn't too consequential by then, as they had all but guaranteed themselves a spot in the NCAA tournament, the losses put Denver into a tie with Colorado College for the conference lead. With the two meeting for the regular season finale, Denver had to win the weekend to capture the MacNaughton Cup. Unfortunately, they were shutout by the Tigers in the first game, leaving the team only able to tie for the league crown. A complementary blanking from Mannino helped them do just that and the two long-time rivals were forced to share the regular season title.

=== Conference Tournament ===
Though Denver and Colorado College were tied with identical records, the Pioneers held the tiebreaker and received the #1 seed for the WCHA tournament. The team utterly dominated Michigan Tech in the first game but they were pushed hard in the rematch. Despite firing 46 shots on goal, only one got past Cam Ellsworth. Fortunately, Mannino stopped everything that came his way and the team advanced to the conference semifinals.

They met long-time rival North Dakota at the Xcel Energy Center and the two battled through a defensive struggle. Both teams were only able to score a single goal in regulation thanks to their respective power plays. With 60 minutes not enough to settle the score, the two prepared for overtime. While the match was set up to go long into the night, Gauthier ended the match on the first shot of the extra session. In the championship, only Colorado College stood in the Pioneers' way Denver had another defensive struggle on its hands. Despite possessing the #2 offense in the country, the Pioneers could only muster a single goal, again on the power play. Mannino, however, posted his 5th shutout of the season and allowed Luke Fulghum's marker to stand as the game-winner.

=== NCAA Tournament ===
Denver sat atop both polls at the end of the season. In spite of this, however, they received the #2 overall seed in the tournament. To make matters worse, Minnesota was the host for the West Regional and, since the Gophers were also a #1 seed, Denver was slotted to open in Amherst, Massachusetts.

The Pioneers' faced CHA tournament champion Bemidji State in the Beavers' first Division I tournament game. While Denver was expected to roll over the unranked BSU squad, the Pios found themselves trailing twice early in the game. Bemidji State fought hard and never let Denver put any distance between the two. Despite being outshout 45–22, the Beavers equaled the Pios with 3 goals in regulation and sent the game into overtime. Denver controlled the play for much of the later portion of the game and they continued into the extra frame. After three and a half minutes the Pios had 5 shots to Bemidji's 1, the last of which found its way into the goal and prevented a stunning upset. The second game for the Pioneers went a little bit smoother. After trading 1-goal leads with New Hampshire, a strong third period allowed the Pioneers to pull away from the Wildcats. The game was capped off by a hat-trick from Gauthier in the waning seconds.

In the Frozen Four, Denver found three of its conference rivals waiting for them. This marked the first time in history, in any sport, that all four teams reaching the National Semifinals all came from the same conference.

As a consequence of Fisher's struggles against Bemidji State and Peter Mannino stronger performance over the course of the entire season, Gwozdecky ended the goaltender rotation and went with his best option in goal. He needn't have worried, however, as Denver trounced Colorado College in the semifinal. The Pioneers outshout the Tigers 43–29 and, more importantly, outscored their in-state rivals 6–2. Most stunning was that all 8 goals in the game were scored in the power play, setting an NCAA tournament record.

For the chance to repeat as national champions, Denver faced an old foe in North Dakota. The two had med three times prior for the national title with the most recent coming in 1968. Jeff Drummond opened the scoring early in the first but Denver's lead was erased just a few minutes later on a power play marker from Travis Zajac. The score remained even until just past the midway point of the game when Stastny added a goal on the man-advantage. It took another 18 minutes for the next goal but it was again Stastny on the power play. Despite a furious assault by North Dakota in the third, Denver's lead held and the game was salted away by Gabe Gauthier's 26 goal of the season into an empty net.

== Departures ==
Player	Position	Nationality	Cause
Adam Berkhoel	Goaltender	United States	Graduation (signed with Atlanta Thrashers)
Max Bull	Forward	United States	Graduation (signed with Lubbock Cotton Kings)
Ryan Caldwell	Defenseman	Canada	Graduation (signed with New York Islanders)
Lukas Dora	Forward	Czech Republic	Graduation (signed with Reading Royals)
Scott Drewicki	Defenseman	Canada	Transferred to Merrimack
Connor James	Forward	Canada	Graduation (signed with Los Angeles Kings)
Greg Keith	Forward	Canada	Graduation (signed with Idaho Steelheads)
Scott McConnell	Forward	United States	Graduation (retired)

== Recruiting ==
Player	Position	Nationality	Age	Notes
Zach Blom	Defenseman	United States	21	Englewood, CO
Steven Cook	Forward	United States	20	Denver, CO; red shirt
Ryan Dingle	Forward	United States	20	Steamboat Springs, CO
Peter Mannino	Goaltender	United States	20	Farmington Hills, MI
Tom May	Forward	United States	19	Eagan, MN
Geoff Paukovich	Forward	United States	18	Englewood, CO; selected 57th overall in 2004
Paul Stastny	Forward	United States	18	Quebec City, QC
Andrew Thomas	Defenseman	United States	18	Bow, NH

== Roster ==
As of August 12, 2021.

No.	Nat.	Player	Class	Pos	Height	Weight	DoB	Hometown	Previous team	NHL rights
2		Zach Blom	Freshman	D	6' 0" (1.83 m)	190 lb (86 kg)	1983-01-16	Englewood, Colorado	Wichita Falls Rustlers (NAHL)	—
3		Steven Cook	Freshman (RS)	F	6' 1" (1.85 m)	190 lb (86 kg)	1984-02-01	Denver, Colorado	River City Lancers (USHL)	—
4		Brett Skinner	Junior	D	6' 1" (1.85 m)	194 lb (88 kg)	1983-06-28	Brandon, Manitoba	Des Moines Buccaneers (USHL)	VAN, 68th overall 2002
5		Andrew Thomas	Freshman	D	6' 2" (1.88 m)	220 lb (100 kg)	1985-11-14	Bow, New Hampshire	Waterloo Black Hawks (USHL)	—
6		Michael Handza	Sophomore	F	6' 1" (1.85 m)	209 lb (95 kg)	1983-12-29	Glenshaw, Pennsylvania	Pittsburgh Forge (NAHL)	—
7		Adrian Veideman	Sophomore	D	6' 2" (1.88 m)	190 lb (86 kg)	1983-04-13	Sicamous, British Columbia	Salmon Arm Silverbacks (BCHL)	—
8		Jon James	Sophomore	D	6' 1" (1.85 m)	190 lb (86 kg)	1983-09-24	Arnold, Missouri	Chicago Freeze (NAHL)	—
9		Gabe Gauthier	Junior	F	5' 9" (1.75 m)	196 lb (89 kg)	1984-01-20	Torrance, California	Chilliwack Chiefs (BCHL)	—
10		Ryan Helgason	Sophomore	F	6' 0" (1.83 m)	194 lb (88 kg)	1984-05-02	Woodbury, Minnesota	Fairbanks Ice Dogs (NAHL)	—
11		Paul Stastny	Freshman	F	6' 0" (1.83 m)	194 lb (88 kg)	1985-12-27	Quebec City, Quebec	River City Lancers (USHL)	—
12		Geoff Paukovich	Freshman	F	6' 4" (1.93 m)	209 lb (95 kg)	1986-04-24	Englewood, Colorado	USNTDP (USHL)	EDM, 57th overall 2004
14		Tom May	Freshman	F	6' 3" (1.91 m)	212 lb (96 kg)	1985-04-24	Eagan, Minnesota	Des Moines Buccaneers (USHL)	—
15		Jonathan Foster	Senior	F	5' 10" (1.78 m)	185 lb (84 kg)	1982-08-03	Suffern, New York	Dubuque Fighting Saints (USHL)	—
16		Kevin Ulanski (A)	Senior	F	5' 11" (1.8 m)	190 lb (86 kg)	1982-05-19	Madison, Wisconsin	Billings Bulls (NAHL)	—
17		Luke Fulghum	Senior	F	5' 11" (1.8 m)	183 lb (83 kg)	1980-10-16	Colorado Springs, Colorado	Dubuque Fighting Saints (USHL)	—
18		Ted O'Leary	Junior	F	5' 11" (1.8 m)	201 lb (91 kg)	1982-09-01	Arvada, Colorado	Cedar Rapids Roughriders (USHL)	—
19		Ryan Dingle	Freshman	F	5' 11" (1.8 m)	190 lb (86 kg)	1982-08-25	Steamboat Springs, Colorado	Tri-City Storm (USHL)	—
20		Jussi Halme	Senior	D	6' 0" (1.83 m)	181 lb (82 kg)	1980-08-24	Nokia, Finland	Tappara U20 (U20 SM-sarja)	—
21		J. D. Corbin	Sophomore	F	5' 10" (1.78 m)	185 lb (84 kg)	1985-03-23	Littleton, Colorado	USNTDP (USHL)	COL, 249th overall 2004
22		Jeff Rogers	Sophomore	F	6' 1" (1.85 m)	185 lb (84 kg)	1984-01-26	Colorado Springs, Colorado		—
23		Brock McMorris	Junior	F	5' 11" (1.8 m)	185 lb (84 kg)	1983-02-01	Cherry Hills, Colorado	Topeka Scarecrows (USHL)	—
25		Matt Carle	Sophomore	D	6' 0" (1.83 m)	196 lb (89 kg)	1984-09-25	Anchorage, Alaska	River City Lancers (USHL)	SJS, 47th overall 2003
26		Nick Larson (A)	Senior	D	6' 3" (1.91 m)	196 lb (89 kg)	1980-11-08	Moorhead, Minnesota	Dubuque Fighting Saints (USHL)	—
27		Matt Laatsch (C)	Senior (RS)	D	6' 3" (1.91 m)	201 lb (91 kg)	1980-08-19	Lakeville, Minnesota	Dubuque Fighting Saints (USHL)	—
28		Glenn Fisher	Sophomore	G	6' 1" (1.85 m)	190 lb (86 kg)	1983-04-25	Edmonton, Alberta	Fort Saskatchewan Traders (AJHL)	EDM, 148th overall 2002
29		Peter Mannino	Freshman	G	6' 1" (1.85 m)	196 lb (89 kg)	1984-02-17	Farmington Hills, Michigan	Tri-City Storm (USHL)	—
30		Danny King	Sophomore	G	5' 10" (1.78 m)	170 lb (77 kg)	1982-05-08	Colorado Springs, Colorado	Huntsville Wildcats (OPJHL)	—
39		Jeff Drummond	Senior	F	5' 7" (1.7 m)	170 lb (77 kg)	1982-08-04	Leduc, Alberta	Fort McMurray Oil Barons (AJHL)	—

== Standings ==
2004–05 Western Collegiate Hockey Association standings
	Conference							Overall					
	GP	W	L	T	PTS	GF	GA	GP	W	L	T	GF	GA
#1 Denver†*	28	19	7	2	40	114	81	43	32	9	2	174	110
#2 Colorado College†	28	19	7	2	40	98	66	43	31	9	3	160	101
#4 Minnesota	28	17	10	1	35	105	80	44	28	15	1	155	109
#13 Wisconsin	28	16	9	3	35	94	64	41	23	14	4	127	91
#3 North Dakota	28	13	12	3	29	71	67	45	25	15	5	136	103
Minnesota–Duluth	28	11	13	4	26	90	89	38	15	17	6	119	118
Alaska–Anchorage	28	9	15	4	22	72	102	37	12	19	6	94	129
Minnesota State–Mankato	28	8	16	4	20	82	109	38	13	19	6	118	140
St. Cloud State	28	8	19	1	17	66	100	40	14	23	3	109	126
Michigan Tech	28	7	19	2	16	64	98	37	8	25	4	91	136
Championship: Denver † indicates conference regular season champion * indicates conference tournament champion Final rankings: USA Today/USA Hockey Magazine Top 15 Poll

== Schedule and results ==
Date	Time	Opponent^{#}	Rank^{#}	Site	TV	Decision	Result	Attendance	Record
Exhibition
October 7	7:35 PM	vs. Windsor*	#7	Magness Arena • Denver, Colorado (Exhibition)		Fisher	W 6–0	4,506	
Regular Season
October 9	6:07 PM	vs. #6 Minnesota*	#7	Xcel Energy Center • Saint Paul, Minnesota (US Hockey Hall of Fame game)		Fisher	L 2–5	1,7409	0–1–0
October 15	5:05 PM	at #2 Boston College*	#11	Conte Forum • Chestnut Hill, Massachusetts		Mannino	L 2–6	5,810	0–2–0
October 16	5:00 PM	at Northeastern*	#11	Matthews Arena • Boston, Massachusetts		Fisher	W 4–2	1,531	1–2–0
October 22	7:38 PM	vs. St. Cloud State	#13	Magness Arena • Denver, Colorado		Fisher	W 5–2	6,022	2–2–0 (1–0–0)
October 23	7:07 PM	vs. St. Cloud State	#13	Magness Arena • Denver, Colorado		Mannino	W 6–1	6,087	3–2–0 (2–0–0)
October 29	6:07 PM	at #5 Wisconsin	#10	Kohl Center • Madison, Wisconsin		Fisher	L 3–6	10,759	3–3–0 (2–1–0)
October 30	6:07 PM	at #5 Wisconsin	#10	Kohl Center • Madison, Wisconsin		Mannino	W 5–3	12,035	4–3–0 (3–1–0)
November 12	7:35 PM	at #4 Colorado College	#11	Colorado Springs World Arena • Colorado Springs, Colorado (Rivalry)		Fisher	L 1–3	7,686	4–4–0 (3–2–0)
November 13	7:05 PM	vs. #4 Colorado College	#11	Magness Arena • Denver, Colorado (Rivalry)		Mannino	W 6–3	6,077	5–4–0 (4–2–0)
November 19	7:37 PM	vs. #3 Minnesota	#11	Magness Arena • Denver, Colorado		Mannino	L 4–5	6,038	5–5–0 (4–3–0)
November 20	7:07 PM	vs. #3 Minnesota	#11	Magness Arena • Denver, Colorado		Fisher	W 5–2	6,027	6–5–0 (5–3–0)
November 26	7:37 PM	vs. #11 Boston University*	#10	Magness Arena • Denver, Colorado		Fisher	W 4–1	6,199	7–5–0
November 27	7:07 PM	vs. Massachusetts*	#10	Magness Arena • Denver, Colorado		Mannino	W 6–1	6,096	8–5–0
December 3	5:07 PM	at Michigan Tech	#7	MacInnes Student Ice Arena • Houghton, Michigan		Fisher	W 5–1	2,154	9–5–0 (6–3–0)
December 4	5:07 PM	at Michigan Tech	#7	MacInnes Student Ice Arena • Houghton, Michigan		Mannino	W 4–2	2,017	10–5–0 (7–3–0)
December 17	6:07 PM	at Minnesota–Duluth	#7	Duluth Entertainment Convention Center • Duluth, Minnesota		Fisher	T 4–4 ^{OT}	4,849	10–5–1 (7–3–1)
December 18	6:07 PM	at Minnesota–Duluth	#7	Duluth Entertainment Convention Center • Duluth, Minnesota		Mannino	W 5–4 ^{OT}	5,053	11–5–1 (8–3–1)
Denver Cup
January 1	7:07 PM	vs. Air Force*	#7	Magness Arena • Denver, Colorado (Denver Cup semifinal)		Fisher	W 9–4	5,981	12–5–1
January 2	7:07 PM	vs. Northeastern*	#7	Magness Arena • Denver, Colorado (Denver Cup championship)		Mannino	W 4–0	5,960	13–5–1
January 7	7:37 PM	vs. Michigan Tech	#5	Magness Arena • Denver, Colorado		Fisher	L 0–3	5,983	13–6–1 (9–4–1)
January 10	7:07 PM	vs. Michigan Tech	#5	Magness Arena • Denver, Colorado		Mannino	W 1–0	6,013	14–6–1 (10–4–1)
January 21	6:08 PM	at St. Cloud State	#6	National Hockey Center • St. Cloud, Minnesota		Fisher	W 5–2	5,531	15–6–1 (11–4–1)
January 22	6:07 PM	at St. Cloud State	#6	National Hockey Center • St. Cloud, Minnesota		Mannino	W 6–1	5,595	16–6–1 (12–4–1)
January 28	7:37 PM	at Alaska–Anchorage	#5	Magness Arena • Denver, Colorado		Fisher	W 8–4	6,105	17–6–1 (13–4–1)
January 31	7:07 PM	at Alaska–Anchorage	#5	Magness Arena • Denver, Colorado		Mannino	W 3–2 ^{OT}	6,120	18–6–1 (14–4–1)
February 4	6:37 PM	at #13 North Dakota	#4	Ralph Engelstad Arena • Grand Forks, North Dakota (Rivalry)		Fisher	W 4–2	10,908	19–6–1 (15–4–1)
February 5	6:07 PM	at #13 North Dakota	#4	Ralph Engelstad Arena • Grand Forks, North Dakota (Rivalry)		Mannino	W 4–2	11,128	20–6–1 (16–4–1)
February 11	7:37 PM	vs. #4 Wisconsin	#3	Magness Arena • Denver, Colorado		Fisher	W 4–3	6,068	21–6–1 (17–4–1)
February 12	7:07 PM	vs. #4 Wisconsin	#3	Magness Arena • Denver, Colorado		Mannino	T 3–3 ^{OT}	6,094	21–6–2 (17–4–2)
February 18	7:37 PM	vs. Minnesota–Duluth	#1	Magness Arena • Denver, Colorado		Fisher	W 5–4	6,121	22–6–2 (18–4–2)
February 19	7:07 PM	vs. Minnesota–Duluth	#1	Magness Arena • Denver, Colorado		Mannino	L 3–6	6,147	22–7–2 (18–5–2)
February 25	6:37 PM	at Minnesota State–Mankato	#1	Midwest Wireless Civic Center • Mankato, Minnesota		Mannino	L 5–8	3,557	22–8–2 (18–6–2)
February 26	6:07 PM	at Minnesota State–Mankato	#1	Midwest Wireless Civic Center • Mankato, Minnesota		Mannino	W 5–2	4,091	23–8–2 (19–6–2)
March 3	7:37 PM	at #1 Colorado College	#3	Colorado Springs World Arena • Colorado Springs, Colorado (Rivalry)		Fisher	L 0–3	7,881	23–9–2 (19–7–2)
March 4	7:37 PM	vs. #1 Colorado College	#3	Magness Arena • Denver, Colorado (Rivalry)		Mannino	W 5–0	6,179	24–9–2 (20–7–2)
WCHA Tournament
March 11	7:37 PM	vs. Michigan Tech*	#2	Magness Arena • Denver, Colorado (WCHA First Round Game 1)		Fisher	W 7–1	6,002	25–9–2
March 12	7:07 PM	vs. Michigan Tech*	#2	Magness Arena • Denver, Colorado (WCHA First Round Game 2)		Mannino	W 1–0	6,029	26–9–2
Denver Won Series 2–0
March 18	7:07 PM	vs. #13 North Dakota*	#2	Xcel Energy Center • Saint Paul, Minnesota (Rivalry; WCHA semifinals)		Fisher	W 2–1 ^{OT}	13,132	27–9–2
March 19	6:37 PM	vs. #1 Colorado College*	#2	Xcel Energy Center • Saint Paul, Minnesota (Rivalry; WCHA championship)		Mannino	W 1–0	16,507	28–9–2
NCAA Tournament
March 26	10:00 AM	vs. Bemidji State*	#1	Mullins Center • Amherst, Massachusetts (Northeast Regional semifinal)		Fisher	W 4–3 ^{OT}	—	29–9–2
March 27	10:00 PM	vs. #6 New Hampshire*	#1	Mullins Center • Amherst, Massachusetts (Northeast Regional final)		Mannino	W 4–2	3,441	30–9–2
April 7	12:08 PM	vs. #3 Colorado College*	#1	Value City Arena • Columbus, Ohio (Rivalry;National semifinals)	ESPN2	Mannino	W 6–2	17,116	31–9–2
April 9	5:08 PM	vs. #10 North Dakota*	#1	Value City Arena • Columbus, Ohio (Rivalry; National Championship)	ESPN	Mannino	W 4–1	17,155	32–9–2
*Non-conference game. ^{#}Rankings from USCHO.com Poll. All times are in Mountain Time. Source:

== National Championship ==
=== (NE1) Denver vs. (E2) North Dakota ===
April 9	Denver	4 – 1	North Dakota	Value City Arena	Recap

Scoring summary
Period	Team	Goal	Assist(s)	Time	Score
1st	DEN	Jeff Drummond (16)	Ulanski and Gauthier	6:15	1–0 DEN
1st	UND	Travis Zajac (20) – PP	Fuher and Stafford	9:52	1–1
2nd	DEN	Paul Stastny (16) – GW PP	Ulanski and Laatsch	30:08	2–1 DEN
3rd	DEN	Paul Stastny (17) – PP	Carle and Skinner	48:19	3–1 DEN
3rd	DEN	Gabe Gauthier (26) – EN	Stastny	59:23	4–1 DEN
Penalty summary
Period	Team	Player	Penalty	Time	PIM
1st	UND	Matt Greene	Roughing	2:31	2:00
1st	DEN	Adrian Veideman	Roughing	2:31	2:00
1st	UND	Matt Greene	High-Sticking	6:31	2:00
1st	DEN	Andrew Thomas	High-Sticking	8:55	2:00
2nd	DEN	Jussi Halme	Tripping	21:28	2:00
2nd	DEN	Jussi Halme	Hooking	25:55	2:00
2nd	UND	Brian Canady	Contact to the Head-Elbowing	28:26	2:00
2nd	DEN	Paul Stastny	Holding	31:37	2:00
2nd	UND	Rory McMahon	Interference	33:34	2:00
2nd	UND	Andy Schneider	Hooking	37:09	2:00
2nd	DEN	Paul Stastny	Obstruction Hooking	38:06	2:00
3rd	UND	Mike Prpich	Unsportsmanlike Conduct	42:57	2:00
3rd	DEN	Andrew Thomas	Holding	42:57	2:00
3rd	DEN	Michael Handza	Unsportsmanlike Conduct	42:57	2:00
3rd	UND	Matt Greene	Cross-Checking	47:01	2:00
3rd	UND	Nick Fuher	Slashing	48:53	2:00
3rd	DEN	Geoff Paukovich	Interference	49:46	2:00

Shots by period
Team	1	2	3	T
North Dakota	10	12	23	45
Denver	7	11	6	24

Goaltenders
Team	Name	Saves	Goals against	Time on ice
UND	Jordan Parise	20	3	58:10
DEN	Peter Mannino	44	1	60:00

== Scoring statistics ==
Name	Position	Games	Goals	Assists	Points	PIM
Gabe Gauthier	C	43	26	31	57	46
Paul Stastny	C	42	17	28	45	30
Matt Carle	D	43	13	31	44	68
Luke Fulghum	LW	43	23	19	42	14
Brett Skinner	D	43	4	36	40	30
Jeff Drummond	F	42	16	23	39	18
Kevin Ulanski	F	39	11	22	33	24
Jon Foster	LW	42	21	8	29	50
Geoff Paukovich	LW	41	12	9	21	120
Adrian Veideman	D	42	5	14	19	26
J. D. Corbin	LW	41	1	18	19	22
Ryan Dingle	C	43	6	12	18	32
Jussi Halme	D	42	3	11	14	36
Matt Laatsch	D	42	1	10	11	48
Michael Handza	F	36	4	6	10	18
Ryan Helgason	F	29	6	2	8	26
Andrew Thomas	D	42	2	5	7	78
Tom May	F	22	2	2	4	0
Nick Larson	D	34	1	2	3	26
Glenn Fisher	G	22	0	2	2	0
Zach Blom	D	6	0	1	1	0
Brock McMorris	F	7	0	1	1	4
Peter Mannino	G	23	0	1	1	10
Jon James	D	2	0	0	0	4
Ted O'Leary	F	7	0	0	0	4
Total			174	294	468	754

== Goaltending statistics ==
Name	Games	Minutes	Wins	Losses	Ties	Goals against	Saves	Shut outs	SV %	GAA
Peter Mannino	23	1344:40	18	4	1	49	626	5	.927	2.19
Glenn Fisher	22	1247:27	14	5	1	59	473	0	.889	2.84
Empty Net	-	4:54	-	-	-	2	-	-	-	-
Total	43	2597	32	9	2	110	1099	5	.909	2.54

== Rankings ==
Poll	Week																										
Poll	Pre	1	2	3	4	5	6	7	8	9	10	11	12	13	14	15	16	17	18	19	20	21	22	23	24	25	26 (Final)
USCHO.com	7 (4)	-	11	13	10	10	11	11	10	7	6	7	7	5	7	6	5	4	3 (1)	1 (22)	1 (16)	3 (4)	2 (4)	2 (3)	1 (17)	-	-
USA Today	7 (4)	6 (4)	11	13	11	10	12	11	9	8	6	7	7	5	7	6	5	4	3	2 (9)	2 (10)	3 (2)	3 (2)	2 (3)	1 (18)	1 (33)	1 (34)

Note: USCHO did not release a poll in weeks 1, 25 and 26.

== Awards and honors ==
Player	Award	Ref
Peter Mannino	NCAA Tournament Most Outstanding Player	
Matt Carle	AHCA West First Team All-American	
Brett Skinner	AHCA West Second Team All-American	
Gabe Gauthier	AHCA West Second Team All-American	
Paul Stastny	WCHA Rookie Player of the Year	
George Gwozdecky	WCHA Coach of the Year	
Matt Carle	All-WCHA First Team	
Brett Skinner	All-WCHA First Team	
Gabe Gauthier	All-WCHA Second Team	
Paul Stastny	WCHA All-Rookie Team	
Gabe Gauthier	WCHA All-Tournament Team	
Matt Laasch	WCHA All-Tournament Team	
Peter Mannino	NCAA All-Tournament team	
Brett Skinner	NCAA All-Tournament team	
Matt Carle	NCAA All-Tournament team	
Paul Stastny	NCAA All-Tournament team	
Gabe Gauthier	NCAA All-Tournament team	

== Players drafted into the NHL ==
=== 2005 NHL entry draft ===
= NHL All-Star team	= NHL All-Star	= NHL All-Star and NHL All-Star team	= Did not play in the NHL

Round	Pick	Player	NHL team
2	44	Paul Stastny	Colorado Avalanche
2	60	T. J. Fast^{†}	Los Angeles Kings
4	96	Chris Butle^{†}	Buffalo Sabres
4	109	Andrew Thomas	Washington Capitals
7	222	Matt Glasser^{†}	Edmonton Oilers

† incoming freshman
