= 2005 NCAA Division I men's ice hockey tournament =

- 2005 Frozen Four logo
- Teams: 16
- Finals site: Value City Arena, Columbus, Ohio
- Champions: Denver Pioneers (7th title)
- Runner-up: North Dakota Fighting Sioux (12th title game)
- Semifinalists: Minnesota Golden Gophers (19th Frozen Four); Colorado College Tigers (10th Frozen Four)
- Winning coach: George Gwozdecky (2nd title)
- MOP: Peter Mannino (Denver)
- Attendance: 107,003

The 2005 NCAA Division I men's ice hockey tournament involved 16 schools playing in single-elimination play to determine the national champion of men's NCAA Division I college ice hockey. It began on March 25, 2005, and ended with the championship game on April 9. A total of 15 games were played.

This tournament marked the first time in NCAA history, in any Division, in any sport, male or female, that the 4 semi-finalists all hailed from the same conference. Denver, Colorado College, Minnesota, and North Dakota were all members of the Western Collegiate Hockey Association (WCHA).

== Game locations ==
2005 Regionals (blue) and Frozen Four (red)

The NCAA Men's Division I Ice Hockey Championship is a single-elimination tournament featuring 16 teams representing all six Division I conferences in the nation. The Championship Committee seeds the entire field from 1 to 16 within four regionals of 4 teams. The winners of the six Division I conference championships receive automatic bids to participate in the NCAA Championship. Regional placements are based primarily on the home location of the top seed in each bracket with an attempt made to put the top-ranked teams close to their home site.

=== Regional Sites ===
- East — DCU Center, Worcester, Massachusetts (Host: Boston University)
- Midwest — Van Andel Arena, Grand Rapids, Michigan (Host: Western Michigan)
- Northeast — Mullins Center, Amherst, Massachusetts (Host: Massachusetts)
- West — Mariucci Arena, Minneapolis, Minnesota (Host: Minnesota)

=== Frozen Four ===
- Value City Arena, Columbus, Ohio (host: Ohio State University)

== Qualifying teams ==
The at-large bids and seeding for each team in the tournament was announced on March 20, 2005. The Western Collegiate Hockey Association (WCHA) had five teams receive a berth in the tournament, Hockey East had four teams receive a berth in the tournament, the ECACHL had three teams receive a berth in the tournament, the Central Collegiate Hockey Association (CCHA) had two teams receive a berth in the tournament, while Atlantic Hockey and College Hockey America (CHA) both received a single bid for their tournament champions.

East Regional – Worcester							Northeast Regional – Amherst						
Seed	School	Conference	Record	Berth type	Appearance	Last bid	Seed	School	Conference	Record	Berth type	Appearance	Last bid
1	Boston College (1)	Hockey East	25–6–7	Tournament champion	25th	2004	1	Denver (2)	WCHA	28–9–2	Tournament champion	18th	2004
2	North Dakota	WCHA	23–12–5	At-large bid	20th	2004	2	New Hampshire	Hockey East	25–10–5	At-large bid	15th	2004
3	Boston University	Hockey East	22–14–5	At-large bid	28th	2003	3	Harvard	ECACHL	21–9–3	At-large bid	20th	2004
4	Mercyhurst	Atlantic Hockey	18–15–4	Tournament champion	3rd	2003	4	Bemidji State	CHA	23–12–1	Tournament champion	1st	Never
Midwest Regional – Grand Rapids							West Regional – Minneapolis						
Seed	School	Conference	Record	Berth type	Appearance	Last bid	Seed	School	Conference	Record	Berth type	Appearance	Last bid
1	Colorado College (3)	WCHA	29–8–3	At-large bid	17th	2003	1	Minnesota (4)	WCHA	26–14–1	At-large bid	29th	2004
2	Michigan	CCHA	30–7–3	Tournament champion	28th	2004	2	Cornell	ECACHL	26–4–3	Tournament champion	15th	2003
3	Wisconsin	WCHA	23–13–4	At-large bid	21st	2004	3	Ohio State	CCHA	27–10–4	At-large bid	5th	2004
4	Colgate	ECACHL	25–10–3	At-large bid	4th	2000	4	Maine	Hockey East	20–12–7	At-large bid	15th	2004

Number in parentheses denotes overall seed in the tournament.

== Game locations ==
=== First round and regional finals ===
- East – DCU Center, Worcester, Massachusetts
- Midwest – Van Andel Arena, Grand Rapids, Michigan
- Northeast – William D. Mullins Center, Amherst, Massachusetts
- West – Mariucci Arena, Minneapolis, Minnesota

=== Frozen Four ===
- Value City Arena, Columbus, Ohio (host: Ohio State University)

== Bracket ==
Regional Semifinals; March 25–26
1	Boston College (1)	5
4	Mercyhurst	4
East – Worcester – Fri/Sat
2	North Dakota	4
3	Boston University	0
1	Minnesota (4)	1*
4	Maine	0
West – Minneapolis – Sat/Sun
2	Cornell	3
3	Ohio State	2
1	Denver (2)	4*
4	Bemidji State	3
Northeast – Amhurst – Sat/Sun
2	New Hampshire	3*
3	Harvard	2
1	Colorado College (3)	6
4	Colgate	5
Midwest – Grand Rapids – Fri/Sat
2	Michigan	4
3	Wisconsin	1

Regional Finals; March 26–27
1	Boston College (1)	3
2	North Dakota	6
1	Minnesota (4)	2*
2	Cornell	1
1	Denver (2)	4
2	New Hampshire	2
1	Colorado College (3)	4
2	Michigan	3

National Semifinals; April 7
E2	North Dakota	4
W1	Minnesota (4)	2
MW1	Colorado College (2)	2
NE1	Denver (3)	6

National Championship; April 9
E2	North Dakota	1
NE1	Denver (3)	4

Number in parentheses denotes overall seed in the tournament
* denotes overtime period(s)

== Results ==
=== East Regional – Worcester, Massachusetts ===
==== Regional Semifinals ====
March 25, 2005; 4:30 pm	(1) Boston College	5–4 (3–2, 2–2, 0–0)	(4) Mercyhurst	DCU Center

Game reference

Cory Schneider
Goalies
Mike Ella (out 58:18)
Andy Franck (in 58:18)
Referee:
John Campion
Linesmen:
Tim Swaider
Butch Mousseaux

	0 – 1	00:27 – David Wrigley (Warren)
(Havern, Adams) Pat Gannon – 02:27	1 – 1
	1 – 2	07:53 – PP – Ben Cottreau (Borrelli, Kemp)
(Rooney, Alberts) Brian Boyle – PP – 12:18	2 – 2
(Spina) Greg Lauze – PP – 19:25	3 – 2
	3 – 3	24:22 – PP – T. J. Kemp (Hansen, Champagne)
(Lauze, O'Hanley) Ned Havern – PP – 30:36	4 – 3
(Greene) Mike Brennan – GW – 37:33	5 – 3
	5 – 4	39:01 – Rich Hansen (Wrigley, Warren)

20 min
Penalties
24 min
58
Shots
22

March 25, 2005; 8:00 pm	(2) North Dakota	4–0 (1–0, 2–0, 1–0)	(3) Boston University	DCU Center; Attendance: 8,360

Game reference

Jordan Parise
Goalies
John Curry
Referee:
Matt Shegos
Linesmen:
Paul Tunison
Keith Sergott

(Genoway, Fuher) Drew Stafford – GW PP – 19:05	1 – 0
(McMahon, Jones) Colby Genoway – 24:01	2 – 0
(Porter, Genoway) Rory McMahon – 28:29	3 – 0
(Fuher, McMahon) Colby Genoway – 42:40	4 – 0

20 min
Penalties
16 min
27
Shots
29

==== Regional Final ====
March 26, 2005; 8:00 pm	(1) Boston College	3–6 (0–3, 1–1, 2–2)	(2) North Dakota	DCU Center; Attendance: 8,695

Game reference

(out 51:08) Cory Schneider
(in 51:08) Matti Kaltiainen
Goalies
Jordan Parise
Referee:
Matt Shegos
Linesmen:
Paul Tunison
Keith Sergott

	0 – 1	00:42 – Travis Zajac (Fuher, Schneider)
	0 – 2	04:59 – Chris Porter (McMahon)
	0 – 3	10:10 – Drew Stafford (Špirko, Zajac)
	0 – 4	24:22 – GW PP – Travis Zajac (Stafford, Genoway)
(Murphy) Chris Collins – 32:29	1 – 4
(Shannon) Dave Spina – SH – 43:07	2 – 4
	2 – 5	46:04 – Chris Porter (Schneider)
	2 – 6	51:08 – Brian Canady (Fabian)
(Murphy, Lauze) Chris Collins – 55:23	3 – 6

24 min
Penalties
28 min
36
Shots
23

=== Northeast Regional – Amherst, Massachusetts ===
==== Regional Semifinals ====
March 26, 2005; 12:00 pm	(1) Denver	4–3 (OT) (2–2, 1–0, 0–1, 1–0)	(4) Bemidji State	Mullins Center

Game reference

Glenn Fisher
Goalies
Matt Climie
Referee:
Jeff Bunyon
Linesmen:
Tim Lowe
Bob Bernard

	0 – 1	01:20 – Shane Holman (Haider)
(Ulanski, Gauthier) Andrew Thomas – 05:35	1 – 1
	1 – 2	11:14 – Jean-Guy Gervais (unassisted)
(Laatsch, Dingle) Tom May – 12:18	2 – 2
(Gauthier, Drummond) Kevin Ulanski – 21:02	3 – 2
	3 – 3	42:17 – PP – Brendan Cook (Jonsson)
(Skinner, Gauthier) Kevin Ulanski – GW – 63:26	4 – 3

12 min
Penalties
12 min
49
Shots
25

March 26, 2005; 3:30 pm	(2) New Hampshire	3–2 (OT) (0–1, 1–1, 1–0, 1–0)	(3) Harvard	Mullins Center; Attendance: 3,622

Game reference

Kevin Regan
Goalies
Dov Grumet-Morris
Referee:
Steve Piotrwoski
Linesmen:
Kevin Langseth
John Philo

	0 – 1	09:26 – Ryan Maki (Du, Lannon)
(Teplitsky) Sean Collins – PP – 27:35	1 – 1
	1 – 2	27:43 – Alex Meintel (Magura, Lederman)
(Collins, Teplitsky) Preston Callander – PP – 43:44	2 – 2
(Aikins, Micflikier) Daniel Winnik – GW – 75:06	3 – 2

10 min
Penalties
16 min
46
Shots
41

==== Regional Final ====
March 27, 2005; 12:00 pm	(1) Denver	4–2 (1–1, 1–1, 2–0)	(2) New Hampshire	Mullins Center; Attendance: 3,441

Game reference

Peter Mannino
Goalies
Kevin Regan
Referee:
Steve Piotrwoski
Linesmen:
Kevin Langseth
John Philo

(Ulanski, Drummond) Gabe Gauthier – 13:42	1 – 0
	1 – 1	14:36 – Jacob Micflikier (Flaishans, Winnik)
	1 – 2	33:27 – PS – Daniel Winnik (unassisted)
(Veideman, Carle) Gabe Gauthier – PP – 38:02	2 – 2
(Fulghum) Ryan Dingle – GW – 56:17	3 – 2
(Ulanski, Drummond) Gabe Gauthier – EN – 59:37	4 – 2

14 min
Penalties
18 min
46
Shots
33

=== Midwest Regional – Grand Rapids, Michigan ===
==== Regional Semifinals ====
March 25, 2005; 5:00 pm	(1) Colorado College	6–5 (3–2, 1–1, 2–2)	(4) Colgate	Van Andel Arena

Game reference

Curtis McElhinney
Goalies
Steve Silverthorn
Referee:
Conrad Hache
Linesmen:
Kevin Shea
Jack Millea

(Slattengren) Brian Salcido – PP – 02:29	1 – 0
	1 – 1	08:16 – Jon Smyth (unassisted)
(Cox) Aaron Slattengren – 12:26	2 – 1
(Polaski) Marty Sertich – 13:15	3 – 1
	3 – 2	14:01 – Jon Smyth (Spencer)
(Crabb, Frischmon) Lee Sweatt – 28:02	4 – 2
	4 – 3	30:56 – SH – Adam Mitchell (McKinnon)
(Sertich) Brett Sterling – PP – 45:56	5 – 3
	5 – 4	50:17 – Justin Spencer (DelGiacco)
	5 – 5	54:13 – Adam Mitchell (Wilson, DelGiacco)
(Petiot) Brett Sterling – GW – 55:28	6 – 5

20 min
Penalties
34 min
39
Shots
17

March 25, 2005; 8:30 pm	(2) Michigan	4–1 (2–0, 1–0, 1–1)	(3) Wisconsin	Van Andel Arena; Attendance: 6,312

Game reference

Al Montoya
Goalies
Bernd Brückler
Referee:
Scott Hansen
Linesmen:
Tom Fyrer
Joey Andrews

(Kolarik, Werner) Jeff Tambellini – PP – 07:08	1 – 0
(Hensick, Tambellini) Brandon Rogers – GW – 13:48	2 – 0
(Tambellini) T. J. Hensick – 38:00	3 – 0
(Hensick, Hunwick) Jeff Tambellini – 47:04	4 – 0
	4 – 1	54:43 – Adam Burish (Earl, Gilbert)

10 min
Penalties
20 min
31
Shots
18

==== Regional Final ====
March 26, 2005; 5:00 pm	(1) Colorado College	4–3 (0–2, 2–1, 2–0)	(2) Michigan	Van Andel Arena; Attendance: 6,571

Game reference

Curtis McElhinney
Goalies
Al Montoya
Referee:
Scott Hansen
Linesmen:
Tom Fyrer
Joey Andrews

	0 – 1	09:17 – PP – Jeff Tambellini (Werner, Ebbett)
	0 – 2	15:14 – PP – Brandon Kaleniecki (Moss, Rogers)
	0 – 3	21:32 – Eric Nystrom (Ebbett)
(Sweatt, Salcido) Marty Sertich – PP – 26:13	1 – 3
(Stuart, Crabb) Trevor Frischmon – SH – 35:27	2 – 3
(Frischmon) Joey Crabb – 44:24	3 – 3
(Brunkhorst, Salcido) Trevor Frischmon – GW – 50:06	4 – 3

12 min
Penalties
26 min
23
Shots
27

=== West Regional – Minneapolis, Minnesota ===
==== Regional Semifinals ====
March 26, 2005; 1:30 pm	(1) Minnesota	1–0 (OT) (0–0, 0–0, 0–0, 1–0)	(4) Maine	Mariucci Arena

Game reference
Kellen Briggs	Goalies	Jimmy Howard	Referee: Peter Feola; Linesmen: Chip McDonald; Scott Whittemore
(Smaagaard, Sertich) Evan Kaufmann – GW – 61:46 / 1 – 0			Referee: Peter Feola; Linesmen: Chip McDonald; Scott Whittemore
10 min	Penalties	20 min	Referee: Peter Feola; Linesmen: Chip McDonald; Scott Whittemore
38	Shots	25	Referee: Peter Feola; Linesmen: Chip McDonald; Scott Whittemore

March 26, 2005; 5:00 pm	(2) Cornell	3–2 (0–1, 2–1, 1–0)	(3) Ohio State	Mariucci Arena; Attendance: 9,583

Game reference

David McKee
Goalies
Dave Caruso
Referee:
Derek Shepherd
Linesmen:
Kile Bergren
Nathan Freeeman

	0 – 1	10:46 – Dominic Maiani (Fritsche, Anderson)
	0 – 2	32:58 – PP – Tom Fritsche (unassisted)
(Moulson, Scott) Doug Krantz – 33:16	1 – 2
(Cam Abbott, Gleed) Chris Abbott – 36:22	2 – 2
(Moulson, Sawada) Mike Iggulden – GW – 48:23	3 – 2

10 min
Penalties
6 min
20
Shots
36

==== Regional Final ====
March 27, 2005; 2:30 pm	(1) Minnesota	2–1 (OT) (0–0, 1–1, 0–0, 1–0)	(2) Cornell	Mariucci Arena; Attendance: 9,054

Game reference

Kellen Briggs
Goalies
David McKee
Referee:
Kevin Hall
Linesmen:
Brian Hill
Dave Kronenberg

	0 – 1	33:02 – SH – Mitch Carefoot (Pegoraro)
(Smaagaard) Andy Sertich – 34:45	1 – 1
(Howe) Barry Tallackson – GW – 64:31	2 – 1

8 min
Penalties
14 min
39
Shots
18

=== Frozen Four – Columbus, Ohio ===
==== National Semifinals ====
April 7, 2005; 2:00 pm	(NE1) Denver	6–2 (2–0, 2–1, 2–1)	(MW1) Colorado College	Value City Arena; Attendance: 17,116

Game reference

Peter Mannino
Goalies
Curtis McElhinney
Referee:
Matt Shegos
Linesmen:
Brian Hill
John Philo

(Carle, Skinner) Luke Fulghum – PP – 13:54	1 – 0
(Skinner, Gauthier) Luke Fulghum – PP – 15:26	2 – 0
(Skinner, Drummond) Matt Carle – GW PP – 26:05	3 – 0
	3 – 1	29:49 – PP – Brian Salcido (Sweatt, Crabb)
(Fulghum, Carle) Gabe Gauthier – PP – 39:50	4 – 1
(Drummond, Skinner) Gabe Gauthier – PP – 45:42	5 – 1
	5 – 2	53:02 – PP – James Brannigan (Polich, Stuart)
(May, Mannino) Adrian Veideman - PP - 59:15	6 – 2

20 min
Penalties
28 min
29
Shots
43

April 7, 2005; 7:00 pm	(W1) Minnesota	2–4 (0–1, 0–1, 2–2)	(E2) North Dakota	Value City Arena; Attendance: 17,094

Game reference

Kellen Briggs
Goalies
Jordan Parise
Referee:
Steve Piotrowski
Linesmen:
Paul Tunison
Kevin Langseth

	0 – 1	05:34 – Erik Fabian (unassisted)
	0 – 2	30:12 – Erik Fabian (Canady, Jones)
	0 – 3	40:45 – GW PP – Travis Zajac (Stafford, Fuher)
	0 – 4	45:00 – SH – Travis Zajac (Stafford, Greene)
(Vannelli, Guyer) Mike Howe – PP – 46:17	1 – 4
(Howe, Vannelli) Gino Guyer – PP – 47:40	2 – 4

10 min
Penalties
16 min
28
Shots
32

==== National Championship ====
April 9, 2005; 7:00 pm	(NE1) Denver	4–1 (1–1, 1–0, 2–0)	(E2) North Dakota	Value City Arena; Attendance: 17,155

Game reference
Referee: Steve Piotrowski; Linesmen: Kevin Langseth; Paul Tunison

Scoring summary
Period	Team	Goal	Assist(s)	Time	Score
1st	DEN	Jeff Drummond (16)	Ulanski and Gauthier	6:15	1–0 DEN
1st	UND	Travis Zajac (20) – PP	Fuher and Stafford	9:52	1–1
2nd	DEN	Paul Stastny (16) – GW PP	Ulanski and Laatsch	30:08	2–1 DEN
3rd	DEN	Paul Stastny (17) – PP	Carle and Skinner	48:19	3–1 DEN
3rd	DEN	Gabe Gauthier (26) – EN	Stastny	59:23	4–1 DEN
Penalty summary
Period	Team	Player	Penalty	Time	PIM
1st	UND	Matt Greene	Roughing	2:31	2:00
1st	DEN	Adrian Veideman	Roughing	2:31	2:00
1st	UND	Matt Greene	High-sticking	6:31	2:00
1st	DEN	Andrew Thomas	High-sticking	8:55	2:00
2nd	DEN	Jussi Halme	Tripping	21:28	2:00
2nd	DEN	Jussi Halme	Hooking	25:55	2:00
2nd	UND	Brian Canady	Contact to the head – Elbowing	28:26	2:00
2nd	DEN	Paul Stastny	Holding	31:37	2:00
2nd	UND	Rory McMahon	Interference	33:34	2:00
2nd	UND	Andy Schneider	Hooking	37:09	2:00
2nd	DEN	Paul Stastny	Obstruction – Hooking	38:06	2:00
3rd	UND	Mike Prpich	Unsportsmanlike conduct	42:57	2:00
3rd	DEN	Andrew Thomas	Holding	42:57	2:00
3rd	DEN	Michael Handza	Unsportsmanlike conduct	42:57	2:00
3rd	UND	Matt Greene	Cross-checking	47:01	2:00
3rd	UND	Nick Fuher	Slashing	48:53	2:00
3rd	DEN	Geoff Paukovich	Interference	49:46	2:00

Shots by period
Team	1	2	3	T
North Dakota	10	12	23	45
Denver	7	11	6	24

Goaltenders
Team	Name	Saves	Goals against	Time on ice
UND	Jordan Parise	20	3	58:10
DEN	Peter Mannino	44	1	60:00

== All-Tournament team ==
- G: Peter Mannino* (Denver)
- D: Brett Skinner (Denver)
- D: Matt Carle (Denver)
- F: Paul Stastny (Denver)
- F: Travis Zajac (North Dakota)
- F: Gabe Gauthier (Denver)

* Most Outstanding Player(s)

== Record by conference ==
Conference	# of Bids	Record	Win %	Regional Finals	Frozen Four	Championship Game	Champions
WCHA	5	11-4	.733	4	4	2	1
Hockey East	4	2-4	.333	2	-	-	-
ECACHL	3	1-3	.250	1	-	-	-
CCHA	2	1-2	.333	1	-	-	-
Atlantic Hockey	1	0-1	.000	-	-	-	-
CHA	1	0-1	.000	-	-	-	-
