= Ryan Dingle =

American ice hockey player (born 1984)

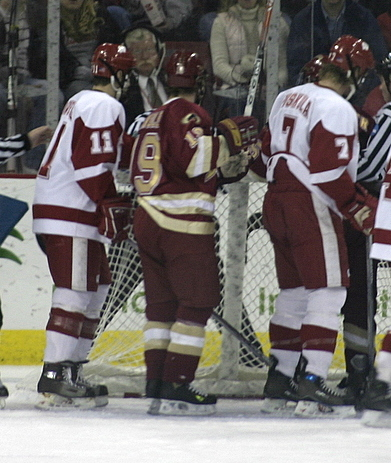
- Dingle (center) playing for the Denver Pioneers in 2006
- Born: April 13, 1984 (age 42) Steamboat Springs, Colorado, USA
- Height: 5 ft 11 in (180 cm)
- Weight: 190 lb (86 kg; 13 st 8 lb)
- Position: Center
- Shot: Left
- Played for: Denver; Portland Pirates; Augusta Lynx; Iowa Chops; Adirondack Phantoms; Victoria Salmon Kings; SG Cortina; Fife Flyers; Coventry Blaze
- Playing career: 2007–2018

Ryan Dingle is an American ice hockey coach and former professional centre. He won a National Championships with Denver in 2005.

== Career ==
Dingle played three seasons of junior hockey in the USHL. Though he was limited to just 38 games in 2004, he averaged nearly a point per game while helping the Tri-City Storm win a regular season title and march all the way to the Clark Cup finals. The following season, he joined the ice hockey team at Denver and provided depth scoring while the team repeated as national champions. Dingle adjusted to the college game in his sophomore year and finished third in team scoring behind future NHL all-stars Paul Stastny and Matt Carle. He had a slight regression as a junior but generated enough interest to sign a professional contract after the season.

For his first full year as a professional, Dingle spent most of his time in the ECHL. He did receive a brief callup to the Portland Pirates but it wasn't until the Anaheim Ducks changed their affiliation to the Iowa Chops that he became an AHL regular. Dingle spent two full seasons playing AAA-hockey but he never managed to find his scoring touch. After dropping back down to the ECHL he had a rather poor outing with the Victoria Salmon Kings and then headed to Europe to continue his career.

In 2011, Dingle signed on with SG Cortina and immediately became one of the team's top scorers. He led the club with 21 goals (tied) and continued to anchor the top line for four years. After the club missed the postseason in 2015, Dingle headed to Scotland and played two years for the Fife Flyers. He finished second on the team in scoring in both years and served as team captain in 2017. After leaving the Flyers, Dingle played one more year in Britain before retiring as a player.

With his playing days over, Dingle returned to Steamboat Springs and became the head coach for the Steamboat Wranglers, a local junior team. Though he kept the job for only one season, he remained with the club as a player development coach while also acting as a Director of youth hockey for Steamboat Springs.

== Career statistics ==
=== Regular season and playoffs ===
			Regular season					Playoffs
Season	Team	League	GP	G	A	Pts	PIM	GP	G	A	Pts	PIM
2001–02	Des Moines Buccaneers	USHL	61	7	10	17	63	3	1	0	1	2
2002–03	Des Moines Buccaneers	USHL	26	8	6	14	16	—	—	—	—	—
2002–03	Tri-City Storm	USHL	32	17	17	34	31	3	0	0	0	6
2003–04	Tri-City Storm	USHL	38	13	23	36	14	11	4	8	12	26
2004–05	Denver	WCHA	43	6	12	18	32	—	—	—	—	—
2005–06	Denver	WCHA	38	27	16	43	37	—	—	—	—	—
2006–07	Denver	WCHA	40	22	15	37	38	—	—	—	—	—
2006–07	Portland Pirates	AHL	4	0	1	2	4	—	—	—	—	—
2007–08	Augusta Lynx	ECHL	50	10	17	27	51	5	0	1	1	4
2007–08	Portland Pirates	AHL	19	1	5	6	10	2	0	1	1	4
2008–09	Iowa Chops	AHL	70	11	7	18	21	—	—	—	—	—
2009–10	Adirondack Phantoms	AHL	54	5	5	10	18	—	—	—	—	—
2010–11	Victoria Salmon Kings	ECHL	56	8	8	16	45	12	1	4	5	6
2011–12	SG Cortina	Serie A	41	21	13	34	16	9	5	1	6	8
2012–13	SG Cortina	Serie A	40	15	24	39	32	7	6	3	9	4
2013–14	SG Cortina	Serie A	38	28	24	52	14	9	9	7	16	6
2014–15	SG Cortina	Serie A	32	21	19	40	52	—	—	—	—	—
2015–16	Fife Flyers	EIHL	49	19	30	49	34	4	2	0	2	0
2016–17	Fife Flyers	EIHL	41	31	23	54	32	2	1	0	1	4
2017–18	Coventry Blaze	EIHL	50	25	28	53	47	2	1	1	2	0
USHL totals			157	45	56	101	124	17	5	8	13	12
NCAA totals			121	55	43	98	107	—	—	—	—	—
ECHL totals			106	18	25	43	96	17	1	5	6	10
AHL totals			147	17	18	35	53	6	0	1	1	2
Serie A totals			153	87	80	167	114	25	20	11	31	18
EIHL totals			140	75	81	156	113	8	4	1	5	4

== Awards and honors ==
Award	Year
All-WCHA Third Team	2006
All-WCHA Third Team	2007
