= Adrian Veideman =

Canadian ice hockey player

- Born: April 13, 1983 (age 43) Sicamous, British Columbia, CAN
- Height: 6 ft 2 in (188 cm)
- Weight: 190 lb (86 kg; 13 st 8 lb)
- Position: Defenseman
- Shot: Left
- Played for: Denver; Portland Pirates; Augusta Lynx; Iowa Chops; Peoria Rivermen; Iserlohn Roosters; Black Wings Linz; Vienna Capitals; Stavanger Oilers; Colorado Eagles
- Playing career: 2007–2016

Adrian A. Veideman is a Canadian former professional ice hockey Defenseman. He won two National Championships with Denver in 2004 and 2005 as well as Austrian and Norwegian league championships.

== Career ==
Veideman was a high-scoring defenseman for his junior team, the Salmon Arm Silverbacks. He averaged exactly a point per game over two seasons before making the jump to the college ranks with Denver. His offensive output decreased significantly with the Pioneers but Veideman was still a major contributor on defense. He helped Denver win the national championship as a freshman and then repeat the following year. Though Denver missed the tournament in his final two seasons with the program, Veideman served as team captain during his senior season and led them to a winning record.

After graduating with a bachelor's in finance/real estate, Veideman began his professional career with the Augusta Lynx. His scoring from juniors returned in force and he appeared in both the ECHL All-Star Game and on the ECHL All-Rookie Team. While he received a brief callup during the year, it wasn't until 2009 that he got a good shot at the AHL. He performed well during the year but found himself in his third organization the following year. Veideman's stop in Peoria did not turn out well and after just 1 point in 14 games he left the team.

Veideman travelled to Germany and joined the Iserlohn Roosters midway through the year. He played well enough to earn an extension and remained with the club through the end of the 2011 season. Unfortunately, Iserlohn missed the postseason both years and allowed Veideman to leave afterwards. The following year saw Veideman join Black Wings Linz and help the team win both the regular season and postseason titles. With his first league championship in his back pocket, Veideman changed teams again but remained in Austria. Though his offense declined, he helped the Vienna Capitals win a regular season title and then finish as the postseason runners-up. A second regular season title the following year ended with a knockout in the quarterfinals and Veideman was once again on the move. He spent all of the 2015 season with the Stavanger Oilers and helped the club win both league championships. With his playing career winding down, Veideman returned to North America and spent one year with the Colorado Eagles. He led the team in scoring by defensemen and helped the Eagles win the regular season championship and was named a first team all-star. After the team lost in the first round of the playoffs, Veideman retired as a player.

With his playing days behind him, Veideman remained in the area and began working as a real estate agent. While continuing in that role, he could not stay away from hockey and began working as an assistant coach in the local youth league. In 2018 he joined the staff at Valor Christian High where he remains as of 2022.

== Career statistics ==
=== Regular season and playoffs ===
			Regular season					Playoffs
Season	Team	League	GP	G	A	Pts	PIM	GP	G	A	Pts	PIM
2001–02	Salmon Arm Silverbacks	BCHL	60	23	32	55	30	—	—	—	—	—
2002–03	Salmon Arm Silverbacks	BCHL	53	28	30	58	16	—	—	—	—	—
2003–04	Denver	WCHA	42	4	7	11	26	—	—	—	—	—
2004–05	Denver	WCHA	42	5	14	19	26	—	—	—	—	—
2005–06	Denver	WCHA	31	6	11	17	20	—	—	—	—	—
2006–07	Denver	WCHA	36	3	10	13	44	—	—	—	—	—
2007–08	Augusta Lynx	ECHL	66	11	29	40	67	5	1	2	3	4
2007–08	Portland Pirates	AHL	6	1	1	2	2	6	0	1	1	2
2008–09	Iowa Chops	AHL	63	6	21	27	56	—	—	—	—	—
2009–10	Peoria Rivermen	AHL	14	0	1	1	6	—	—	—	—	—
2009–10	Iserlohn Roosters	DEL	20	3	5	8	6	—	—	—	—	—
2010–11	Iserlohn Roosters	DEL	52	6	22	28	36	—	—	—	—	—
2011–12	Black Wings Linz	EBEL	50	5	26	31	44	17	3	6	9	4
2012–13	Vienna Capitals	EBEL	41	4	12	16	24	15	2	7	9	20
2013–14	Vienna Capitals	EBEL	54	4	31	35	23	3	0	0	0	0
2014–15	Stavanger Oilers	GET-ligaen	43	6	21	27	42	15	2	4	6	18
2015–16	Colorado Eagles	ECHL	70	17	27	44	22	6	0	1	1	6
BCHL totals			113	51	62	113	46	—	—	—	—	—
NCAA totals			151	18	42	60	116	—	—	—	—	—
ECHL totals			136	28	56	84	89	11	1	3	4	10
AHL totals			83	7	23	30	64	6	0	1	1	2
DEL totals			72	9	27	36	42	—	—	—	—	—
Austria totals			145	13	69	82	91	35	5	13	18	24

== Awards and honors ==
Award	Year
NCAA Division I Championship	2004
NCAA Division I Championship	2005
ECHL All-Star Game	2007–08
ECHL All-Rookie Team	2007–08
EBEL Champion	2011–12
GET-ligaen Champion	2014–15
All-ECHL First Team	2015–16
