= Marty Sertich =

American ice hockey player

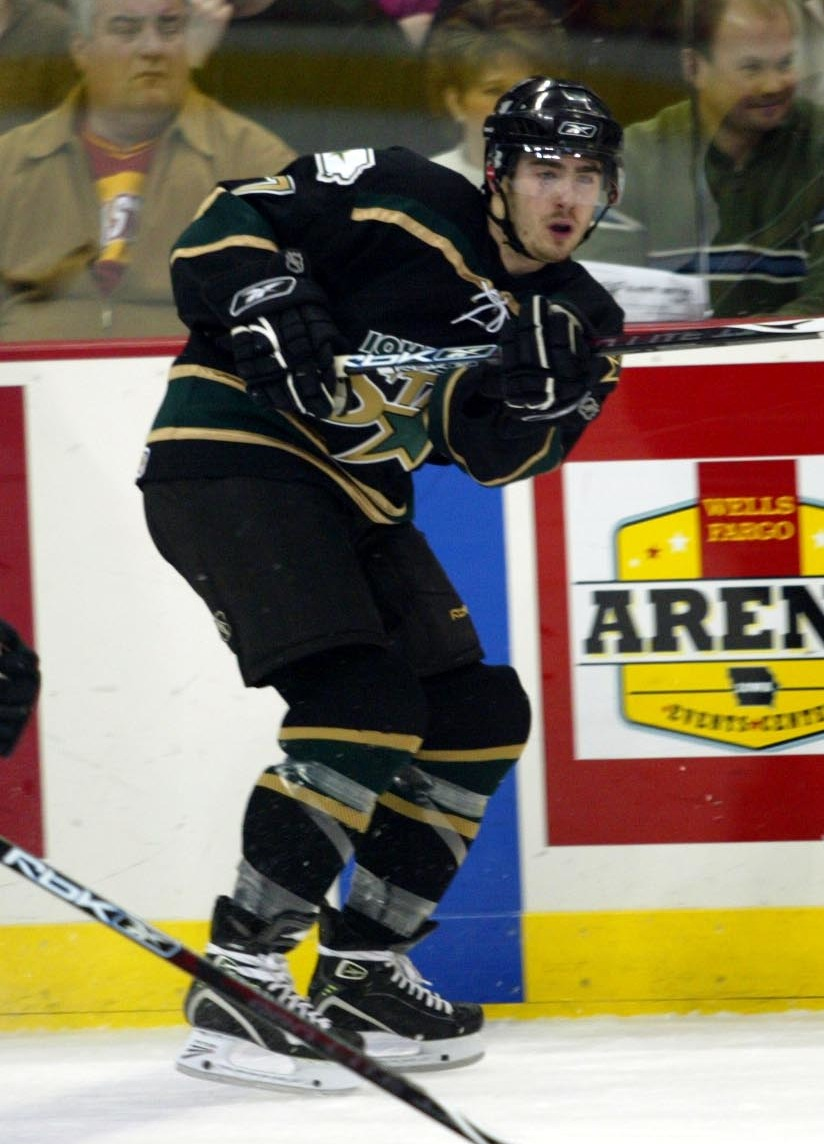
- Sertich with the Iowa Stars in 2006
- Born: October 13, 1982 (age 43) Roseville, Minnesota, U.S.
- Height: 5 ft 8 in (173 cm)
- Weight: 165 lb (75 kg; 11 st 11 lb)
- Position: Center
- Shot: Left
- Played for: Iowa Stars; Lake Erie Monsters; EHC Olten; Iserlohn Roosters; Hamburg Freezers
- NHL draft: Undrafted
- Playing career: 2006–2016

Martin Sertich (born October 13, 1982) is an American former professional ice hockey center who played in the American Hockey League (AHL) with the Iowa Stars and Lake Erie Monsters.

== Playing career ==
Sertich attended Colorado College for four years, winning the Hobey Baker Award as a junior in 2005 after leading the nation in points (64). Sertich also had an impressive season in his senior year as captain, being honored as a finalist for the Hobey Baker. Over his four years with Colorado College, Sertich dressed for every game.

Much in the same vein as fellow Hobey Baker winner and former teammate Junior Lessard, Sertich signed a two-year contract with the Dallas Stars as a free agent following his collegiate play on July 10, 2006.

On June 10, 2008, Sertich was traded from the Dallas Stars to the Colorado Avalanche in exchange for a conditional draft pick in 2009 NHL entry draft. Sertich was later signed to a multi-year contract with the Avalanche on June 24, 2008. Marty was assigned to AHL affiliate, the Lake Erie Monsters, for the 2008–09 season but had his season limited to only 24 games as he suffered two separate concussions.

In the 2009–10 season, Sertich returned and improved his season totals to 28 points in 53 games before he was again struck down with a concussion against the Milwaukee Admirals on February 10, 2010, ruling him out for the remainder of the season.

On April 17, 2010, Sertich signed as a free agent to a one-year contract with Swiss team, EHC Olten of the second tier National Liga B.

In each of his three seasons with Olten, Sertich led the team in points and was amongst the league's top scorers. On July 21, 2013, Sertich left Switzerland as a free agent and signed a one-year contract with German club, Iserlohn Roosters of the Deutsche Eishockey Liga.

Following his Iserlohn stint, Sertich stayed in the German league, signing a two-year deal with the Hamburg Freezers in April 2014.

== Career statistics ==
			Regular season					Playoffs
Season	Team	League	GP	G	A	Pts	PIM	GP	G	A	Pts	PIM
2000–01	Roseville Area High School	HS-MN	28	41	22	63	—	—	—	—	—	—
2001–02	Sioux Falls Stampede	USHL	61	19	33	52	30	3	1	0	1	0
2002–03	Colorado College	WCHA	42	9	20	29	26	—	—	—	—	—
2003–04	Colorado College	WCHA	39	11	28	39	12	—	—	—	—	—
2004–05	Colorado College	WCHA	42	27	37	64	26	—	—	—	—	—
2005–06	Colorado College	WCHA	42	14	36	50	55	—	—	—	—	—
2006–07	Iowa Stars	AHL	44	13	20	33	24	2	0	1	1	0
2007–08	Iowa Stars	AHL	79	27	25	52	42	—	—	—	—	—
2008–09	Lake Erie Monsters	AHL	24	7	8	15	12	—	—	—	—	—
2009–10	Lake Erie Monsters	AHL	53	9	19	28	22	—	—	—	—	—
2010–11	EHC Olten	SUI II	38	21	43	64	42	—	—	—	—	—
2011–12	EHC Olten	SUI II	33	13	32	45	4	5	1	3	4	0
2011–12	HC Lugano	NLA	2	0	0	0	2	—	—	—	—	—
2012–13	EHC Olten	SUI II	47	19	41	60	26	16	3	16	19	16
2013–14	Iserlohn Roosters	DEL	50	9	33	42	39	9	1	1	2	8
2014–15	Hamburg Freezers	DEL	52	7	28	35	12	7	1	5	6	4
2015–16	Hamburg Freezers	DEL	46	5	14	19	4	—	—	—	—	—
AHL totals			200	56	72	128	100	2	0	1	1	0
SUI II totals			118	53	116	169	72	21	4	19	23	16
DEL totals			148	21	75	96	55	16	2	6	8	12

== Awards and honors ==
Awards	Year
College
All-WCHA First Team	2005
AHCA West First-Team All-American	2005
USA Hockey College Player of the Year	2005
All-WCHA Second Team	2006
Hobey Baker Award Finalist	2006

Awards and achievements
Preceded by Paul Martin	Minnesota Mr. Hockey; 2001	Succeeded by Gino Guyer
Preceded by Junior Lessard	WCHA Player of the Year; 2004–05	Succeeded by Matt Carle
Preceded by Junior Lessard	NCAA Ice Hockey Scoring Champion; 2004–05	Succeeded by Ryan Potulny
Preceded by Junior Lessard	Winner of the Hobey Baker Award; 2004–05	Succeeded by Matt Carle
