= Andrew Thomas (ice hockey) =

American ice hockey player (born 1985)

- Born: November 14, 1985 (age 40) Bow, New Hampshire, U.S.
- Height: 6 ft 2 in (188 cm)
- Weight: 220 lb (100 kg; 15 st 10 lb)
- Position: Defense
- Shot: Right
- Played for: Iowa Chops; Lowell Devils; Albany Devils; Adirondack Phantoms; Binghamton Senators; Syracuse Crunch; HDD Olimpija Ljubljana; Orli Znojmo
- NHL draft: 109th overall, 2005; Washington Capitals
- Playing career: 2008–2014

Andrew Thomas is an American former professional ice hockey defenseman. He won a National Championships with Denver in 2005.

== Playing career ==
After helping the Waterloo Black Hawks win the Clark Cup, Thomas began his college career in the fall of 2004. He joined the program at Denver just in time to help the Pioneers repeat at national champions. After the season, Thomas was selected by the Washington Capitals in the 2005 NHL entry draft. The hard-nosed defenseman remained at Denver for four years, and was routinely among the most penalized players on the team. During his senior season, Thomas served as team captain and helped the club both win the WCHA championship and make the NCAA tournament.

After graduating with a degree in business administration, Thomas signed with the Anaheim Ducks organization and split his first year as a professional between the AHL and ECHL. The following year he joined the New Jersey Devils farm system and spent most of the next three seasons playing AA-hockey. In 2012, Thomas travelled to Europe. He played one season for HDD Olimpija Ljubljana, serving as an assistant captain. The club finished outside the postseason for the Austrian League but did manage to win the Slovenian championship. The next year, Thomas played for Orli Znojmo and, while the team performed much better, the club flamed out in the first round. After the year, Thomas retired as a player.

== Post-playing career ==
Thomas returned to North America and signed on as a Hockey Operations Coordinator with Rensselaer but remained with the program for just one season. Thomas moved to the Boston area and worked for College Hockey Inc. for about a year before moving away from the sport taking a position as a project manager with J. Calnan & Associates, a construction company. He has worked for several firms in the years since and currently is a Manager for Hudl (as of 2022).

== Career statistics ==
			Regular season					Playoffs
Season	Team	League	GP	G	A	Pts	PIM	GP	G	A	Pts	PIM
2003–04	Waterloo Black Hawks	USHL	57	1	6	7	86	12	0	2	2	14
2004–05	University of Denver	WCHA	42	2	5	7	78	—	—	—	—	—
2005–06	University of Denver	WCHA	38	1	3	4	65	—	—	—	—	—
2006–07	University of Denver	WCHA	40	2	5	7	71	—	—	—	—	—
2007–08	University of Denver	WCHA	41	1	7	8	64	—	—	—	—	—
2008–09	Iowa Chops	AHL	25	0	4	4	26	—	—	—	—	—
2008–09	Bakersfield Condors	ECHL	25	0	14	14	19	7	0	0	0	12
2009–10	Lowell Devils	AHL	1	0	0	0	2	—	—	—	—	—
2009–10	Trenton Devils	ECHL	71	3	18	21	82	—	—	—	—	—
2010–11	Albany Devils	AHL	28	2	1	3	18	—	—	—	—	—
2010–11	Trenton Devils	ECHL	41	2	4	6	25	—	—	—	—	—
2011–12	Adirondack Phantoms	AHL	12	0	0	0	2	—	—	—	—	—
2011–12	Binghamton Senators	AHL	2	0	0	0	0	—	—	—	—	—
2011–12	Syracuse Crunch	AHL	2	0	0	0	0	—	—	—	—	—
2011–12	Trenton Devils	ECHL	35	0	7	7	16	—	—	—	—	—
2012–13	HDD Olimpija Ljubljana	EBEL	54	3	17	20	65	—	—	—	—	—
2013–14	Orli Znojmo	EBEL	48	4	6	10	46	5	0	1	1	4
AHL totals			70	2	5	7	48	—	—	—	—	—
EBEL totals			102	7	23	30	111	5	0	1	1	4
