= Brian Salcido =

American ice hockey player (born 1985)

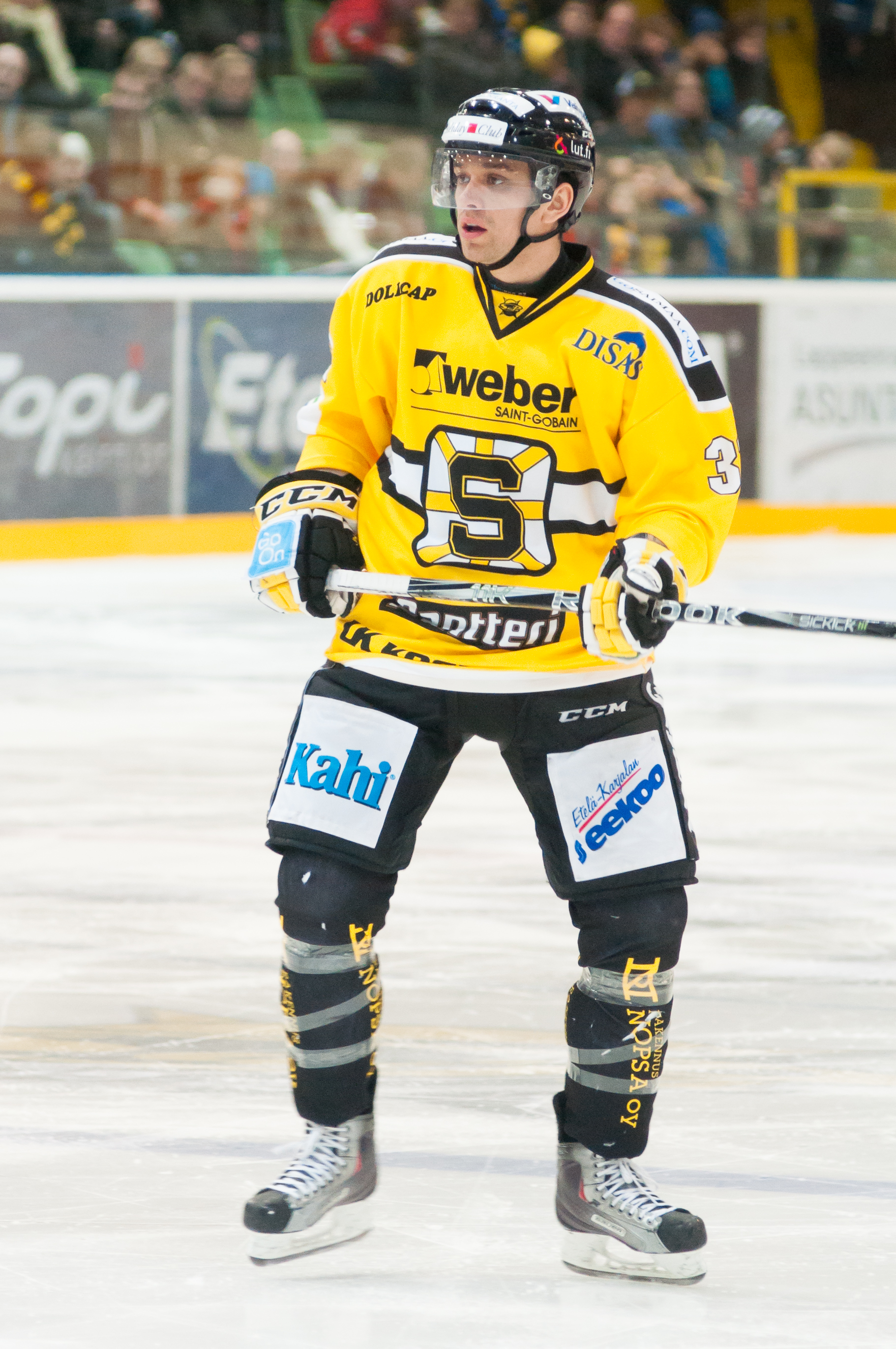
- Born: April 14, 1985 (age 41) Los Angeles, California, U.S.
- Height: 6 ft 2 in (188 cm)
- Weight: 198 lb (90 kg; 14 st 2 lb)
- Position: Defense
- Shot: Left
- Played for: Anaheim Ducks; HC Sparta Praha; SaiPa; Amur Khabarovsk; JYP; ERC Ingolstadt; Tingsryds AIF
- NHL draft: 141st overall, 2005; Mighty Ducks of Anaheim
- Playing career: 2006–2018

Brian Michael Salcido (born April 14, 1985) is an American former professional ice hockey player. He was the 23rd California-born NHL hockey player and the first born and developed player from southern California to play for the Anaheim Ducks.

== Playing career ==
Salcido was born in Los Angeles, California. As a youth, he played in the 1999 Quebec International Pee-Wee Hockey Tournament with the Los Angeles Junior Kings minor ice hockey team. He later moved to Minnesota to play for Shattuck-Saint Mary's high school, noted for its midget AAA hockey program. From 2003 until 2006, Salcido attended Colorado College and was a member of the varsity ice hockey squad. Salcido was drafted by the Ducks in the fifth round, 141st overall of the 2005 NHL entry draft.

On August 2, 2006, Salcido signed with Anaheim on a three-year entry-level contract, he was assigned to the Portland Pirates of the American Hockey League. On February 20, 2009, he made his NHL debut with the Anaheim Ducks against the Detroit Red Wings. He signed a one-year contract with the Ducks on July 6, 2009.

On May 13, 2013 Salcido signed with HC Amur Khabarovsk of the Kontinental Hockey League. After 23 games with Khabarovsk and unable to attain a regular defensive role, Salcido returned to the Liiga with JYP Jyväskylä.

On July 24, 2014, Salcido transferred from JYP to return to SaiPa as a free agent on a one-year deal. In the 2014–15 season, Salcido enjoyed his best season in the Finnish Liiga, contributing with 12 goals and 35 points in 59 games from the blueline with SaiPa leading the league in scoring for a defenseman.

Salcido left Finland as a free agent at season's end, agreeing to a two-year contract with German club ERC Ingolstadt of the Deutsche Eishockey Liga on May 20, 2015. In the second year of his contract in the 2016–17 season, Salcido appeared in 52 games for 22 points before suffering a preliminary playoff loss to the Fischtown Pinguins to conclude his tenure with ERC.

== Career statistics ==
			Regular season					Playoffs
Season	Team	League	GP	G	A	Pts	PIM	GP	G	A	Pts	PIM
2001–02	Shattuck–Saint Mary's	18U AA	47	19	34	53	73	—	—	—	—	—
2002–03	Shattuck–Saint Mary's	MNHS	53	8	35	43	24	—	—	—	—	—
2003–04	Colorado College	WCHA	12	1	0	1	8	—	—	—	—	—
2004–05	Colorado College	WCHA	37	7	23	30	48	—	—	—	—	—
2005–06	Colorado College	WCHA	42	8	32	40	69	—	—	—	—	—
2006–07	Portland Pirates	AHL	76	7	20	27	80	—	—	—	—	—
2007–08	Portland Pirates	AHL	71	11	42	53	58	18	0	6	6	18
2008–09	Iowa Chops	AHL	76	10	33	43	108	—	—	—	—	—
2008–09	Anaheim Ducks	NHL	2	0	1	1	0	—	—	—	—	—
2009–10	Manitoba Moose	AHL	68	8	10	18	50	5	0	1	1	6
2010–11	HC Sparta Praha	ELH	23	2	1	3	38	—	—	—	—	—
2010–11	SaiPa	SM-l	11	1	4	5	12	—	—	—	—	—
2011–12	SaiPa	SM-l	51	5	23	28	81	—	—	—	—	—
2012–13	SaiPa	SM-l	36	7	20	27	49	3	1	1	2	4
2013–14	Amur Khabarovsk	KHL	23	1	4	5	67	—	—	—	—	—
2013–14	JYP	Liiga	24	3	12	15	16	7	0	3	3	8
2014–15	SaiPa	Liiga	59	12	23	35	48	7	0	3	3	0
2015–16	ERC Ingolstadt	DEL	32	4	13	17	37	2	0	0	0	2
2016–17	ERC Ingolstadt	DEL	52	3	19	22	32	2	0	1	1	0
2017–18	Tingsryds AIF	Allsv	38	4	12	16	16	—	—	—	—	—
AHL totals			291	36	105	141	296	23	0	7	7	24
NHL totals			2	0	1	1	0	—	—	—	—	—
Liiga totals			181	28	82	110	206	17	1	7	8	12

== Awards and honors ==
Award	Year
College
All-WCHA Second Team	2005–06
AHL
Second All-Star Team	2007–08
