= Luke Fulghum =

American ice hockey player

- Born: October 16, 1980 (age 45) Colorado Springs, Colorado, U.S.
- Height: 5 ft 11 in (180 cm)
- Weight: 183 lb (83 kg; 13 st 1 lb)
- Position: Forward
- Shoots: Right
- ECHL team Former teams: Colorado Eagles; St. John's Maple Leafs; Toronto Marlies; Bridgeport Sound Tigers; Manchester Phoenix; Coventry Blaze; Sheffield Steelers; Denver Cutthroats
- Playing career: 2005–present

Luke Fulghum (born October 16, 1980, in Colorado Springs, Colorado) is an American professional ice hockey forward, currently playing for the Colorado Eagles of the ECHL.

== Playing career ==
Fulghum began his career in 1998 playing at junior level for the Waterloo Black Hawks in Waterloo, Iowa. The Black Hawks are a Tier 1 junior level hockey team, but despite the high standard, Fulghum adapted well, playing in 52 USHL games and scoring 30 points. His production improved the following season to a point per game in a 47-game spell, helping the Black Hawks into the post-season.

In his final season in Waterloo, Fulghum featured in 21 games and scored 31 points before being traded mid-season to the Dubuque Fighting Saints, fierce rivals to the Black Hawks. Again Fulghum consistently scored points, managing 31 points in 34 games to the end of the season. For the 2001–02 season, Fulghum moved into college hockey, signing for the University of Denver in his home state of Colorado.

In his first season at NCAA level, Fulghum took time to adapt but established himself as a regular player, scoring 12 points in 35 games. This improved in the 2002–03 season to 28 points in 40 games. After four productive seasons in Denver, Fulghum scored a total of 112 points and moved on to the ill-fated AHL St. John's Maple Leafs, but move again after just two games. He split the 2005–06 season between the ECHL Pensacola Ice Pilots and the AHL Toronto Marlies. Fulghum again played for the Marlies in the 2006–07 season, but spent the majority of the season again at ECHL level, this time with the Columbia Inferno.

For 2007–08, Fulghum became a Bridgeport Sound Tigers player, but again failed to establish himself, playing just once before returning to ECHL level with the Stockton Thunder. After just five games another mid-season move took place, this time to the Elmira Jackals. With a regular run in the team, Fulghum again found his scoring touch, with 24 points in 34 games, totals that pushed the Jackals into the post-season where Fulghum scored 4 points in 6 games prior to the Jackals elimination.

In the summer of 2008, Fulghum made the decision to play his hockey in Europe for the first time, signing for the EIHL Manchester Phoenix, a team icing at the highest level of hockey in the United Kingdom. The deal was announced in August 2008 by head coach Tony Hand. Fulghum's first season in UK ice hockey was a positive one which showed off his high work-rate and point scoring ability - Fulghum scored 84 points in just 67 games. At the end of the season, due to off-ice financial problems, the Phoenix chose to play in the EPL instead, meaning they could not keep Fulghum on their roster due to his not having a dual passport. He opted to remain in the EIHL and in June 2009 signed for the Coventry Blaze.

He was released from his contract with the Coventry Blaze on December 1, 2011, and was immediately snapped up by the Sheffield Steelers

On June 21, 2012, Fulghum signed with the Denver Cutthroats for their 2012–13 inaugural season. In doing so, he became the second player in franchise history to join the team, following defenseman Aaron MacKenzie.

After a solitary season with the Cutthroats in which he contributed with 20 goals and 53 points in 65 games, and after initially re-signing with the Cutthroats for another year, Fulgham switched over to cross-town competitors the Colorado Eagles of the ECHL on September 12, 2013.

== Career statistics ==
| | | | Regular season | | | | | Playoffs |
| Season | Team | League | GP | G | A | Pts | PIM | GP | G | A | Pts | PIM |
|---|---|---|---|---|---|---|---|---|---|---|---|---|
| 1998–99 | Waterloo Black Hawks | USHL | 52 | 17 | 13 | 30 | 26 | — | — | — | — | — |
| 1999–00 | Waterloo Black Hawks | USHL | 47 | 28 | 19 | 47 | 69 | 4 | 1 | 1 | 2 | 6 |
| 2000–01 | Waterloo Black Hawks | USHL | 21 | 7 | 12 | 19 | 31 | — | — | — | — | — |
| 2000–01 | Dubuque Fighting Saints | USHL | 34 | 15 | 16 | 31 | 23 | — | — | — | — | — |
| 2001–02 | University of Denver | WCHA | 35 | 5 | 7 | 12 | 8 | — | — | — | — | — |
| 2002–03 | University of Denver | WCHA | 40 | 11 | 17 | 28 | 12 | — | — | — | — | — |
| 2003–04 | University of Denver | WCHA | 43 | 14 | 9 | 23 | 20 | — | — | — | — | — |
| 2004–05 | University of Denver | WCHA | 41 | 21 | 18 | 39 | 12 | — | — | — | — | — |
| 2004–05 | St. John's Maple Leafs | AHL | 2 | 0 | 1 | 1 | 0 | — | — | — | — | — |
| 2005–06 | Pensacola Ice Pilots | ECHL | 44 | 13 | 20 | 33 | 82 | — | — | — | — | — |
| 2005–06 | Toronto Marlies | AHL | 15 | 3 | 1 | 4 | 15 | — | — | — | — | — |
| 2006–07 | Columbia Inferno | ECHL | 65 | 26 | 17 | 43 | 23 | — | — | — | — | — |
| 2006–07 | Toronto Marlies | AHL | 6 | 1 | 0 | 1 | 0 | — | — | — | — | — |
| 2007–08 | Stockton Thunder | ECHL | 5 | 1 | 1 | 2 | 0 | — | — | — | — | — |
| 2007–08 | Elmira Jackals | ECHL | 34 | 14 | 10 | 24 | 10 | 6 | 4 | 0 | 4 | 0 |
| 2007–08 | Bridgeport Sound Tigers | AHL | 1 | 0 | 0 | 0 | 0 | — | — | — | — | — |
| 2008–09 | Manchester Phoenix | EIHL | 52 | 27 | 33 | 60 | 34 | 2 | 1 | 1 | 2 | 2 |
| 2009–10 | Coventry Blaze | EIHL | 56 | 48 | 32 | 80 | 62 | 3 | 5 | 1 | 6 | 2 |
| 2010–11 | Coventry Blaze | EIHL | 54 | 38 | 33 | 71 | 36 | 2 | 0 | 2 | 2 | 0 |
| 2011–12 | Coventry Blaze | EIHL | 26 | 12 | 16 | 33 | 15 | — | — | — | — | — |
| 2011–12 | Sheffield Steelers | EIHL | 40 | 19 | 25 | 44 | 15 | 2 | 0 | 2 | 2 | 0 |
| 2012–13 | Denver Cutthroats | CHL | 65 | 20 | 33 | 53 | 34 | 5 | 1 | 2 | 3 | 0 |
| 2013–14 | Colorado Eagles | ECHL | 65 | 25 | 19 | 44 | 42 | 6 | 2 | 2 | 4 | 2 |
| EIHL totals | | | 228 | 144 | 139 | 283 | 151 | 9 | 6 | 6 | 12 | 4 |
