= Gabe Gauthier =

American ice hockey player

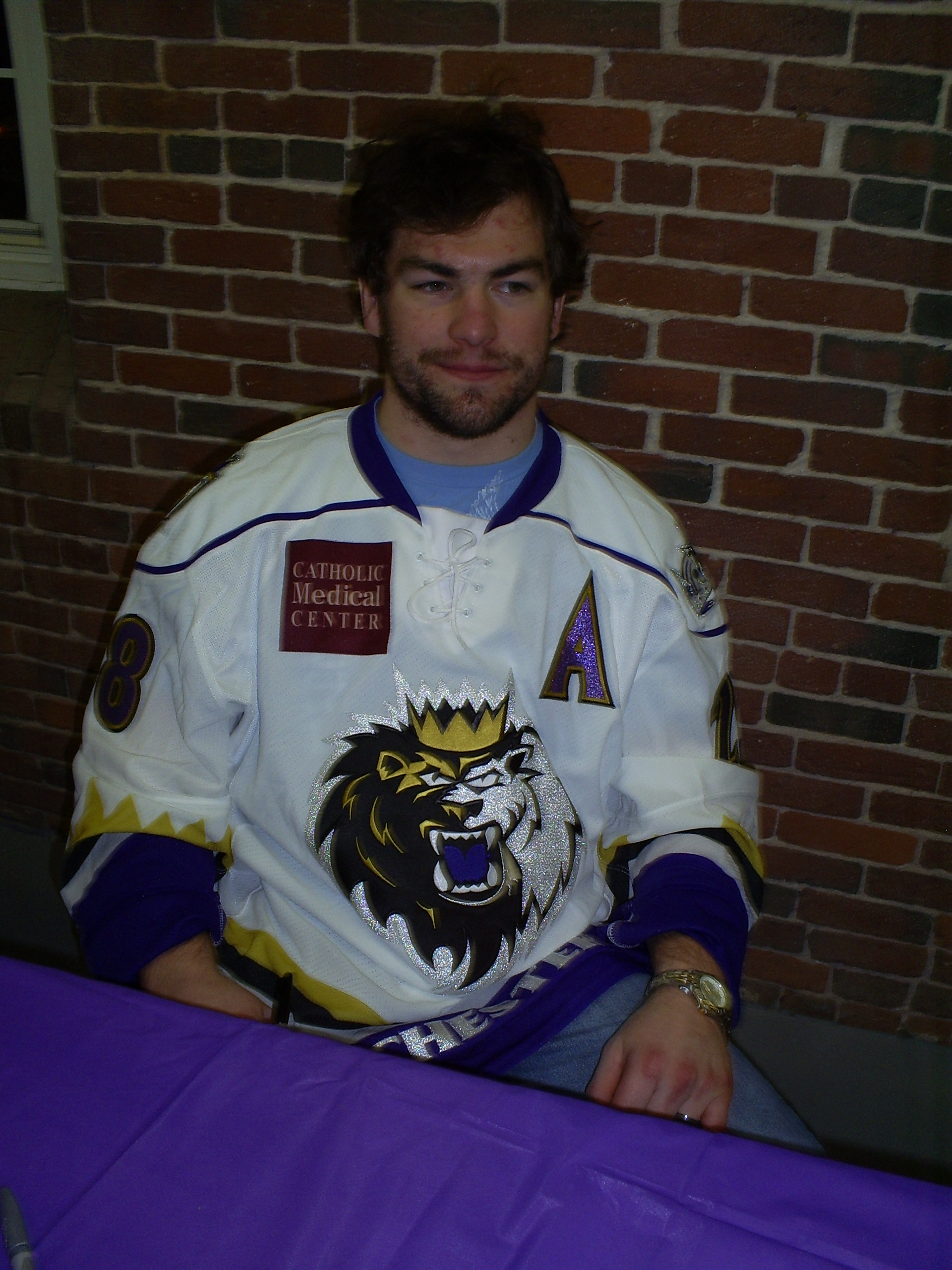
- Born: January 20, 1984 (age 42) Torrance, California, U.S.
- Height: 5 ft 9 in (175 cm)
- Weight: 200 lb (91 kg; 14 st 4 lb)
- Position: Center
- Shot: Left
- Played for: Los Angeles Kings; Augsburger Panther (DEL)
- NHL draft: Undrafted
- Playing career: 2006–2013

Gabriel Robert Gauthier (born January 20, 1984) is an American former professional ice hockey forward who is currently the head coach of the Las Vegas Storm in the Western States Hockey League. He played eight games in the NHL with the Los Angeles Kings.

== Playing career ==
As a youth, Gauthier played in the 1998 Quebec International Pee-Wee Hockey Tournament with the Los Angeles Junior Kings minor ice hockey team.

Gauthier played Tier II Junior hockey with the Chilliwack Chiefs of the British Columbia Hockey League from 1999 until 2002. He then entered university with the University of Denver, where he played four seasons helping the Pioneers win two consecutive NCAA Championships in 2004 and 2005. After graduation, he was signed as a free agent to a two-year contract by the Kings in 2006. He has played for the Kings organization, mostly for the Manchester Monarchs of the American Hockey League (AHL), including being selected as the team man of the year in his first season, but he periodically played in the NHL; he appeared in 5 games with the Kings in 2006–07 and 3 games in 2007–08.

After an injury stricken 2010–11 season split between the Victoria Salmon Kings of the ECHL and the Syracuse Crunch of the AHL, Gauthier left North America to sign with Augsburger Panther of the Deutsche Eishockey Liga (DEL) on a one-year contract on July 15, 2011. In the 2011–12 season, Gauthier struggled to adjust in his return from injury, scoring only 10 points in 44 contests.

Looking for a fresh start, Gauthier returned to the state of Colorado and signed a one-year deal with the Colorado Eagles of the ECHL on July 8, 2012. To start the 2012–13 season, he appeared in only 3 games with the Eagles before he was mutually released. After earlier considering to play minor hockey in Colorado with the inaugural Denver Cutthroats of the Central Hockey League (CHL), Gauthier was signed and reunited with former Kings teammate and Cutthroats head coach Derek Armstrong on October 30, 2012.

== Career statistics ==
			Regular season					Playoffs
Season	Team	League	GP	G	A	Pts	PIM	GP	G	A	Pts	PIM
1999–00	Chilliwack Chiefs	BCHL	46	21	34	55	24	—	—	—	—	—
2000–01	Chilliwack Chiefs	BCHL	45	30	51	81	31	—	—	—	—	—
2001–02	Chilliwack Chiefs	BCHL	50	37	62	99	67	—	—	—	—	—
2002–03	University of Denver	WCHA	41	8	8	16	30	—	—	—	—	—
2003–04	University of Denver	WCHA	42	18	25	43	32	—	—	—	—	—
2004–05	University of Denver	WCHA	41	23	29	52	44	—	—	—	—	—
2005–06	University of Denver	WCHA	38	15	24	39	35	—	—	—	—	—
2006–07	Manchester Monarchs	AHL	69	14	28	42	54	16	1	4	5	14
2006–07	Los Angeles Kings	NHL	5	0	0	0	2	—	—	—	—	—
2007–08	Manchester Monarchs	AHL	61	23	37	60	43	3	0	0	0	4
2007–08	Los Angeles Kings	NHL	3	0	0	0	0	—	—	—	—	—
2008–09	Manchester Monarchs	AHL	69	12	30	42	32	—	—	—	—	—
2009–10	Manchester Monarchs	AHL	71	8	27	35	36	16	7	4	11	8
2010–11	Victoria Salmon Kings	ECHL	2	0	0	0	4	—	—	—	—	—
2010–11	Syracuse Crunch	AHL	4	0	0	0	0	—	—	—	—	—
2011–12	Augsburger Panther	DEL	44	2	8	10	30	2	0	0	0	0
2012–13	Colorado Eagles	ECHL	3	0	1	1	0	—	—	—	—	—
2012–13	Denver Cutthroats	CHL	42	12	26	38	26	5	0	1	1	4
NHL totals			8	0	0	0	2	—	—	—	—	—

== Awards and honors ==
Award	Year
All-WCHA Third Team	2003–04
All-WCHA Second Team	2004–05
AHCA West Second-Team All-American	2004–05
WCHA All-Tournament Team	2005
All-NCAA All-Tournament Team	2005
