= Peter Mannino =

American ice hockey player (born 1984)

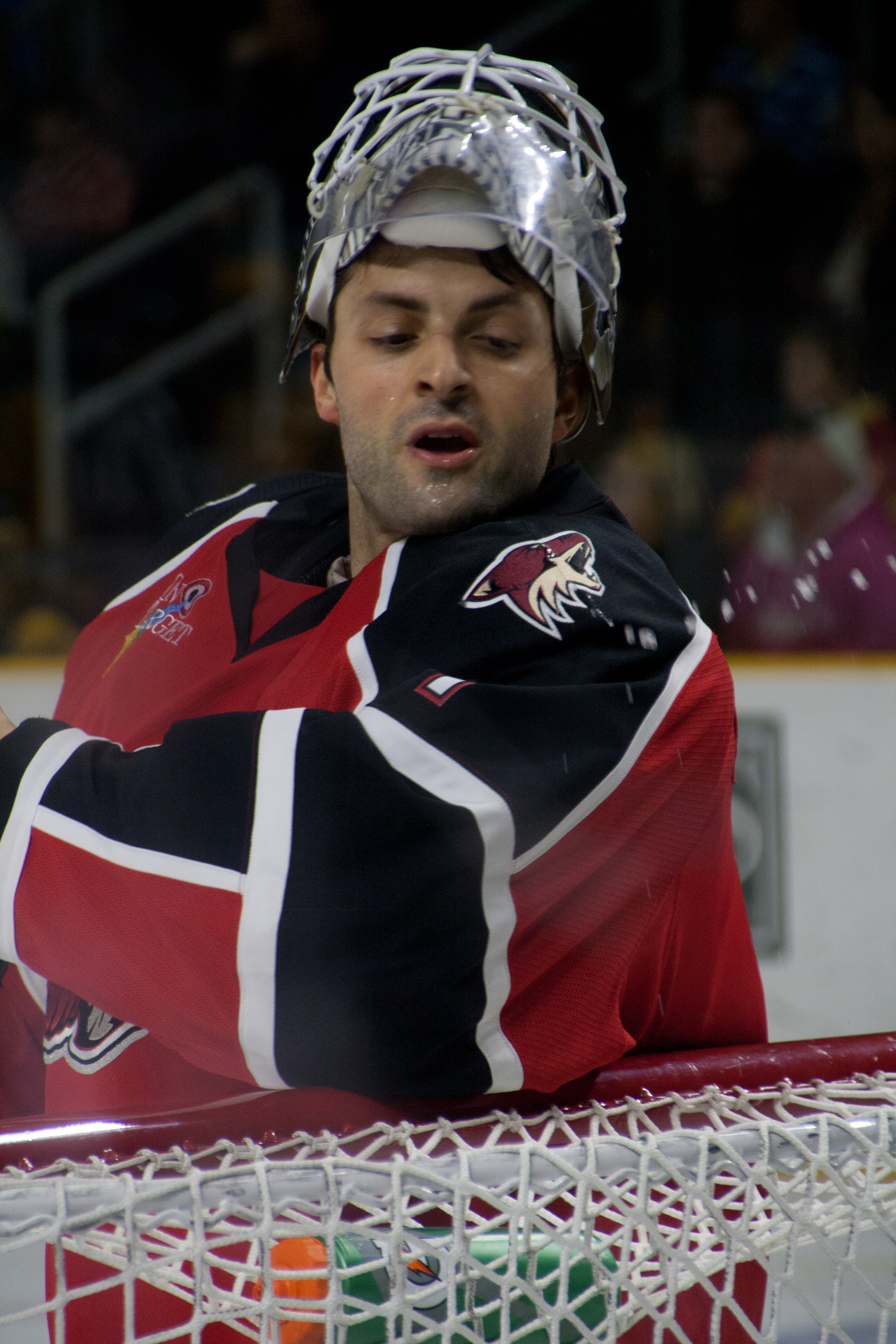
- Born: February 17, 1984 (age 42) Farmington Hills, Michigan, U.S.
- Height: 6 ft 1 in (185 cm)
- Weight: 200 lb (91 kg; 14 st 4 lb)
- Position: Goaltender
- Caught: Left
- Played for: New York Islanders; Atlanta Thrashers; Winnipeg Jets
- NHL draft: Undrafted
- Playing career: 2008–2015
- Coaching career

Biographical details
- Education: University of Denver

Playing career
- 2004–2008: Denver
- Position: Goaltender

Coaching career (HC unless noted)
- 2015–2017: Chicago Steel (asst.)
- 2017–2018: Omaha (asst.)
- 2018–2019: Miami (asso.)
- 2019: Miami (Interim HC)
- 2019–2021: Des Moines Buccaneers
- 2021–2025: Colorado College (asst.)

Peter "Son" Mannino (born February 17, 1984) is an American former professional ice hockey goaltender and current assistant coach for the Colorado College Tigers. He played six games in the National Hockey League for the New York Islanders, Atlanta Thrashers, and the Winnipeg Jets.

== Playing career ==
As a youth, Mannino played in the 1998 Quebec International Pee-Wee Hockey Tournament with the Detroit Honeybaked minor ice hockey team.

Mannino later played as a goaltender for the University of Denver where he led the Pioneers to the 2005 NCAA Championship and Tri-City Storm of the United States Hockey League where he helped them win the Anderson Cup in 2004. On July 3, 2008, Mannino signed with the New York Islanders as an undrafted free agent. He earned a win in his first NHL start with the New York Islanders on March 15, 2009, a 4-2 victory against the Chicago Blackhawks.

On July 6, 2009, Mannino left the Islanders and signed a contract with the Atlanta Thrashers.

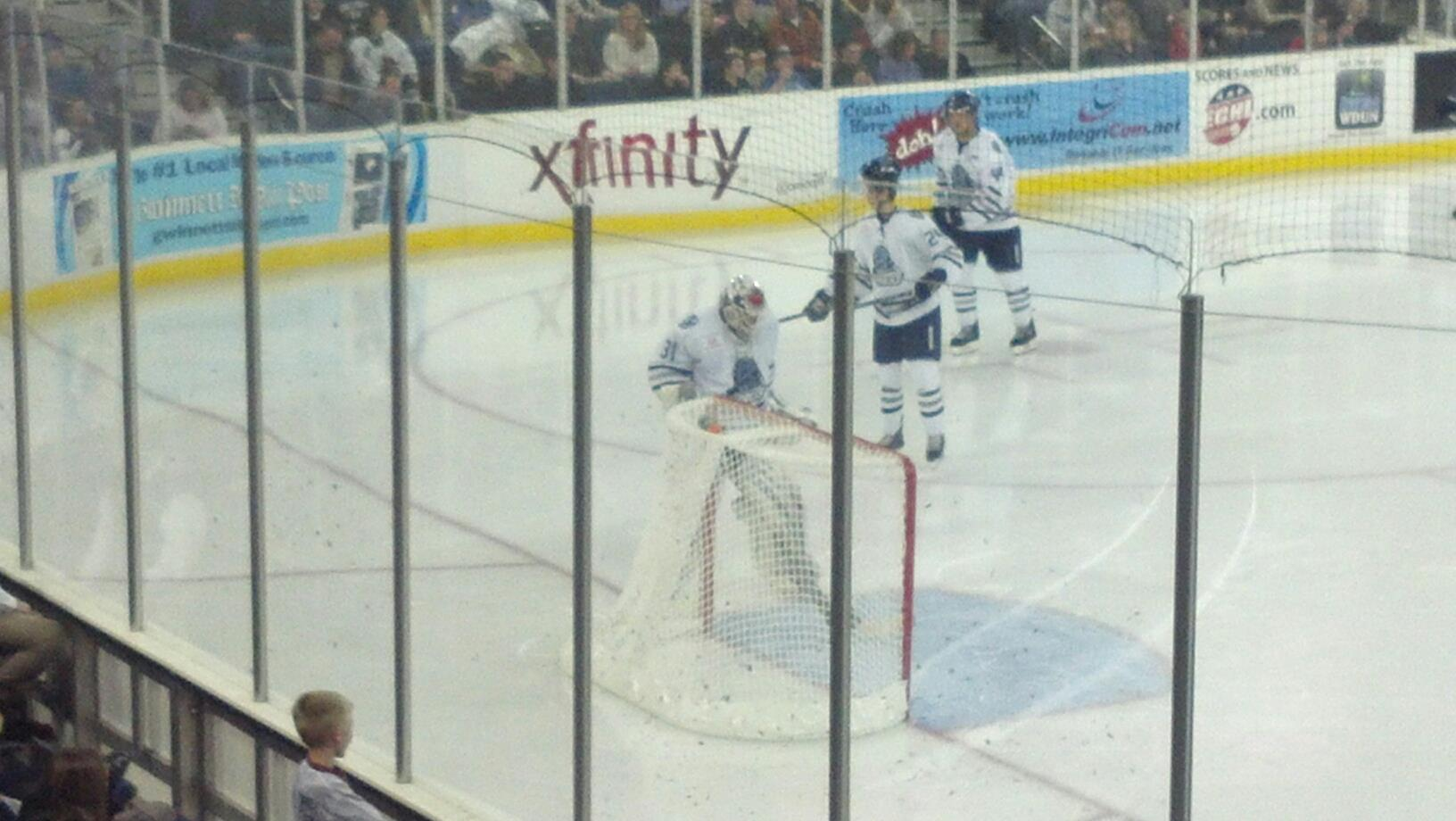
Mannino tending Goal for the Chicago Express.

On January 12, 2012 Mannino was reassigned to the Chicago Express of the ECHL by his parent club the Winnipeg Jets. On March 2, 2012 Mannino was acquired by the Pirates via loan from the St. John's IceCaps. During the 2012–13 season, Mannino signed an AHL contract with the Manchester Monarchs, top affiliate of the Los Angeles Kings, he signed a one-year agreement on December 4, 2012. In 20 games with the Monarchs, Mannino posted 10 wins.

On July 24, 2013, Mannino remained in the AHL agreeing to a one-year contract with the Wilkes-Barre/Scranton Penguins.

A free agent into the 2014–15 season, Mannino initially signed with the Toledo Walleye before he was released to sign with fellow ECHL club the Kalamazoo Wings on October 24, 2014. After one games with the Wings, Mannino returned to the Portland Pirates of the AHL on a try-out contract on November 18, 2014. He was released by the Pirates after three games with the club and later signed for the remainder of the season with the Binghamton Senators on December 27, 2014.

On June 18, 2015, Mannino announced the conclusion of his professional career after seven seasons in accepting an assistant coaching position on the Chicago Steel of the USHL.

== Coaching career ==
=== Chicago Steel ===
On June 18, 2015, Mannino was announced as an assistant coach for the Chicago Steel of USHL.

=== University of Nebraska at Omaha ===
On June 1, 2017, Mannino was hired as an assistant coach at UNO filling out the first staff of new head coach Mike Gabinet.

=== Miami (OH) ===
On March 29, 2018, Mannino was announced as the associate head coach at Miami.

On March 27, 2019, Mannino was elevated to interim head coach of Miami.

=== Des Moines Buccaneers ===
On June 4, 2019, Mannino was announced as head coach of the Des Moines Buccaneers. On July 28, 2020, the Des Moines Buccaneers announced Mannino was promoted to head coach and general manager. He left the team after the 2020–21 season to join the Colorado College Tigers men's ice hockey program as an assistant coach.

== Career statistics ==
			Regular season									Playoffs
Season	Team	League	GP	W	L	T/OT	MIN	GA	SO	GAA	SV%	GP	W	L	MIN	GA	SO	GAA	SV%
2003–04	Tri-City Storm	USHL	38	26	7	0	1988	70	5	2.11	.908	7	4	1	334	12	1	2.15	—
2004–05	University of Denver	WCHA	21	16	4	1	1224	46	5	2.25	.922	—	—	—	—	—	—	—	—
2005–06	University of Denver	WHCA	22	12	8	1	1241	56	1	2.71	.904	—	—	—	—	—	—	—	—
2006–07	University of Denver	WHCA	18	8	6	2	1021	39	3	2.29	.919	—	—	—	—	—	—	—	—
2007–08	University of Denver	WHCA	40	25	14	1	2302	87	6	2.27	.917	—	—	—	—	—	—	—	—
2008–09	Bridgeport Sound Tigers	AHL	34	17	12	2	1959	96	1	2.94	.900	3	1	2	189	10	0	3.18	.867
2008–09	New York Islanders	NHL	3	1	1	0	133	10	0	4.52	.885	—	—	—	—	—	—	—	—
2008–09	Utah Grizzlies	ECHL	9	4	3	2	549	25	0	2.73	.918	—	—	—	—	—	—	—	—
2009–10	Chicago Wolves	AHL	38	26	5	1	2026	79	2	2.34	.921	12	6	5	653	34	2	3.12	.889
2010–11	Chicago Wolves	AHL	42	16	17	4	2232	116	0	3.12	.892	—	—	—	—	—	—	—	—
2010–11	Atlanta Thrashers	NHL	2	0	0	0	73	5	0	4.11	.861	—	—	—	—	—	—	—	—
2011–12	St. John's IceCaps	AHL	10	4	5	0	585	27	1	2.77	.909	—	—	—	—	—	—	—	—
2011–12	Winnipeg Jets	NHL	1	0	0	0	20	0	0	0.00	1.000	—	—	—	—	—	—	—	—
2011–12	Chicago Express	ECHL	22	10	8	4	1334	70	1	3.15	.899	—	—	—	—	—	—	—	—
2011–12	Portland Pirates	AHL	15	8	6	1	854	49	0	3.44	.895	—	—	—	—	—	—	—	—
2012–13	Manchester Monarchs	AHL	20	10	7	0	1069	44	0	2.47	.919	—	—	—	—	—	—	—	—
2013–14	Wilkes-Barre/Scranton Penguins	AHL	18	11	4	1	1036	27	4	1.56	.932	17	9	8	1050	47	0	2.69	.900
2013–14	Wheeling Nailers	ECHL	6	3	3	0	367	14	0	2.29	.926	—	—	—	—	—	—	—	—
2014–15	Kalamazoo Wings	ECHL	1	0	1	0	36	1	0	1.66	.944	—	—	—	—	—	—	—	—
2014–15	Portland Pirates	AHL	3	0	1	0	128	5	0	2.34	.919	—	—	—	—	—	—	—	—
2014–15	Binghamton Senators	AHL	21	6	10	4	1220	81	0	3.99	.891	—	—	—	—	—	—	—	—
NHL totals			6	1	1	0	226	15	0	3.98	.822	—	—	—	—	—	—	—	—

== Awards and honors ==
Award	Year
College
Frozen Four Tournament MVP	2005
NCAA All-Tournament Team	2005
All-WCHA Third Team	2008
WCHA All-Tournament Team	2008

Awards and achievements
Preceded by Adam Berkhoel	NCAA Tournament Most Outstanding Player; 2005	Succeeded by Robbie Earl
