= Denver Cup =

American college ice hockey tournament

Tournament information
- Sport: College ice hockey
- Location: Denver, Colorado
- Number of tournaments: 20
- Format: Single-elimination, round-robin
- Venue: DU Arena, McNichols Arena, Magness Arena
- Teams: 4

Final champion
- Miami

The Denver Cup was a mid-season college ice hockey tournament with the first iteration played in late December 1992. It was Discontinued after the 20th edition of the series.

== History ==
Denver began hosting a mid-season tournament during the winter break for the 1992–93 season. The series was held at the team's home rink, the DU Arena, for the first two years before moving to the larger McNichols Arena, the future home of the Colorado Avalanche. By 1997, the Pioneers were able to get Wells Fargo to sign on as the sponsor to help fund the tournament.

After the McNichols Arena was closed in 1999 and the Avalanche moved to the Pepsi Center, the tournament returned to Denver's campus. In the interim, the Pioneers had built the Magness Arena which, though smaller than the McNichols Arena, had a much larger seating capacity than the DU Arena. By the end of the 2000s, interest in the tournament had waned and Wells Fargo ended its sponsorship after the 2009 series. Denver moved the tournament to the Thanksgiving weekend but, when no sponsor was secured after two years, the series was discontinued. In the final two years the tournament was styled as the 'Denver Cup Classic'.

During its 20-year run, Denver overwhelmingly dominated the series, winning 15 championships. The series had a Single-elimination format for all but one season; the 2009 series was a round-robin tournament with all matches set before the series began.

== Results ==
Year	Champion	Runner-up	Third place	Fourth place
1992	Denver	Notre Dame	Army	Air Force
1993	Denver	Boston College	Princeton	Air Force
1994	Denver	Brown	Ohio State	Air Force
1995	Denver	Colorado College	Cornell	Air Force
1996	Denver	Yale	Maine	Air Force
1997	Miami	New Hampshire	Colorado College	Denver
1998	Denver	Boston College	Colorado College	Lake Superior State
1999	Maine	Denver	Colorado College	Notre Dame
2000	Denver	Providence	Ferris State	Air Force
2001	Denver	Massachusetts–Lowell	Harvard	Bowling Green
2002	Denver	New Hampshire	Miami	Clarkson
2003	Denver	Nebraska–Omaha	Niagara	Yale
2004	Denver	Northeastern	Colgate	Air Force
2005	Boston College	Princeton	Ferris State	Denver
2006	Denver	Massachusetts–Lowell	Brown	Mercyhurst
2007	Denver	Dartmouth	Northern Michigan	Sacred Heart
2008	Boston University	Denver	Holy Cross	Renssealer
2009	Denver	Nebraska–Omaha	St. Lawrence	Boston College
2010	Denver	Air Force	Clarkson	Lake Superior State
2011	Miami	Denver	Princeton	Providence

== Game results ==
=== 1992 ===
Semifinals; December 29
Denver	4
Army	3
Notre Dame	4
Air Force	1

Championship; December 30
Denver	6
Notre Dame	1
Third place
Army	5
Air Force	3

=== 1993 ===
Semifinals; December 28
Denver	5
Princeton	2
Boston College	5
Air Force	1

Championship; December 29
Denver	4
Boston College	2
Third place
Princeton	3*
Air Force	2

=== 1994 ===
Semifinals; December 28
Denver	5
Ohio State	3
Brown	10
Air Force	1

Championship; December 29
Denver	3
Brown	2
Third place
Ohio State	7
Air Force	4

=== 1995 ===
Semifinals; December 27
Denver	11
Air Force	1
Colorado College	11
Cornell	2

Championship; December 28
Denver	3
Colorado College	2
Third place
Cornell	6
Air Force	2

=== 1996 ===
Semifinals; December 27
Denver	4*
Maine	3
Yale	7
Air Force	3

Championship; December 28
Denver	3*
Yale	2
Third place
Maine	12
Air Force	5

=== 1997 ===
Semifinals; December 27
Denver	6
Miami	9
Colorado College	3
New Hampshire	5

Championship; December 28
Miami	4
New Hampshire	2
Third place
Denver	1
Colorado College	6

=== 1998 ===
Semifinals; December 27
Denver	4
Lake Superior State	0
Boston College	5
Colorado College	3

Championship; December 28
Denver	4*
Boston College	3
Third place
Colorado College	9
Lake Superior State	2

=== 1999 ===
Semifinals; December 31
Denver	3*^{†}
Notre Dame	3
Colorado College	3
Maine	4

Championship; January 1
Denver	2
Maine	4
Third place
Notre Dame	2
Colorado College	5

^{†} Denver won in a shootout.

=== 2000 ===
Semifinals; December 29
Denver	5
Air Force	2
Providence	4
Ferris State	2

Championship; December 30
Denver	2
Providence	1
Third place
Air Force	2
Ferris State	3

=== 2001 ===
Semifinals; December 28
Denver	3
Bowling Green	1
Harvard	0
Massachusetts–Lowell	2

Championship; December 29
Denver	2
Massachusetts–Lowell	1
Third place
Bowling Green	3
Harvard	5

=== 2002 ===
Semifinals; December 27
Denver	6
Miami	0
New Hampshire	4
Clarkson	2

Championship; December 28
Denver	4
New Hampshire	0
Third place
Miami	4
Clarkson	2

=== 2003 ===
Semifinals; December 28
Denver	3
Niagara	1
Nebraska–Omaha	5
Yale	2

Championship; December 29
Denver	2
Nebraska–Omaha	1
Third place
Niagara	2
Yale	1

=== 2004 ===
Semifinals; January 1
Denver	9
Air Force	4
Colgate	1
Northeastern	5

Championship; January 2
Denver	4
Northeastern	0
Third place
Air Force	0
Colgate	3

=== 2005 ===
Semifinals; December 30
Denver	1
Princeton	4
Boston College	3*†
Ferris State	3

Championship; December 31
Princeton	1
Boston College	5
Third place
Denver	2
Ferris State	3

^{†} Boston College won in a shootout.

=== 2006 ===
Semifinals; December 29
Denver	3
Mercyhurst	0
Brown	1
Massachusetts–Lowell	1*†

Championship; December 30
Denver	2
Massachusetts–Lowell	1
Third place
Mercyhurst	2
Brown	3*

^{†} Massachusetts–Lowell won in a shootout.

=== 2007 ===
Semifinals; December 28
Denver	5
Sacred Heart	0
Dartmouth	4
Northern Michigan	1

Championship; December 29
Denver	5
Dartmouth	3
Third place
Sacred Heart	2
Northern Michigan	5

=== 2008 ===
Semifinals; January 2
Denver	2*†
Holy Cross	2
Boston University	6
Rensselaer	2

Championship; January 3
Denver	1
Boston University	4
Third place
Holy Cross	4
Rensselaer	3

^{†} Denver won in a shootout.

=== 2009 ===
Date	Winning Team	Score	Losing Team	Score
1 January	Denver	7	Nebraska–Omaha	0
1 January	St. Lawrence	5	Boston College	2
2 January	Denver	4	Boston College	3
2 January	Nebraska–Omaha	2 (SOW)	St. Lawrence	2

=== 2010 ===
Semifinals; November 26
Denver	6
Lake Superior State	3
Air Force	2
Clarkson	1

Championship; November 27
Denver	3
Air Force	1
Third place
Lake Superior State	1
Clarkson	2

=== 2011 ===
Semifinals; November 25
Denver	3
Princeton	0
Miami	6
Providence	2

Championship; November 26
Denver	2
Miami	4
Third place
Princeton	3
Providence	1

== Participating teams ==
Team	# of times participated	Titles
Denver	20	15
Miami	3	2
Boston College	4	1
Maine	2	1
Boston University	1	1
Air Force	8	0
Colorado College	4	0
Princeton Tigers	3	0
Brown	2	0
Clarkson	2	0
Ferris State	2	0
Lake Superior State	2	0
Massachusetts–Lowell	2	0
Nebraska–Omaha	2	0
New Hampshire	2	0
Notre Dame	2	0
Providence	2	0
Yale	2	0
Army	1	0
Bowling Green	1	0
Colgate	1	0
Cornell	1	0
Dartmouth	1	0
Harvard	1	0
Holy Cross	1	0
Mercyhurst	1	0
Niagara	1	0
Northeastern	1	0
Northern Michigan	1	0
Ohio State	1	0
Rensselaer	1	0
Sacred Heart	1	0
St. Lawrence	1	0
