= Matt Carle =

American ice hockey player (born 1984)

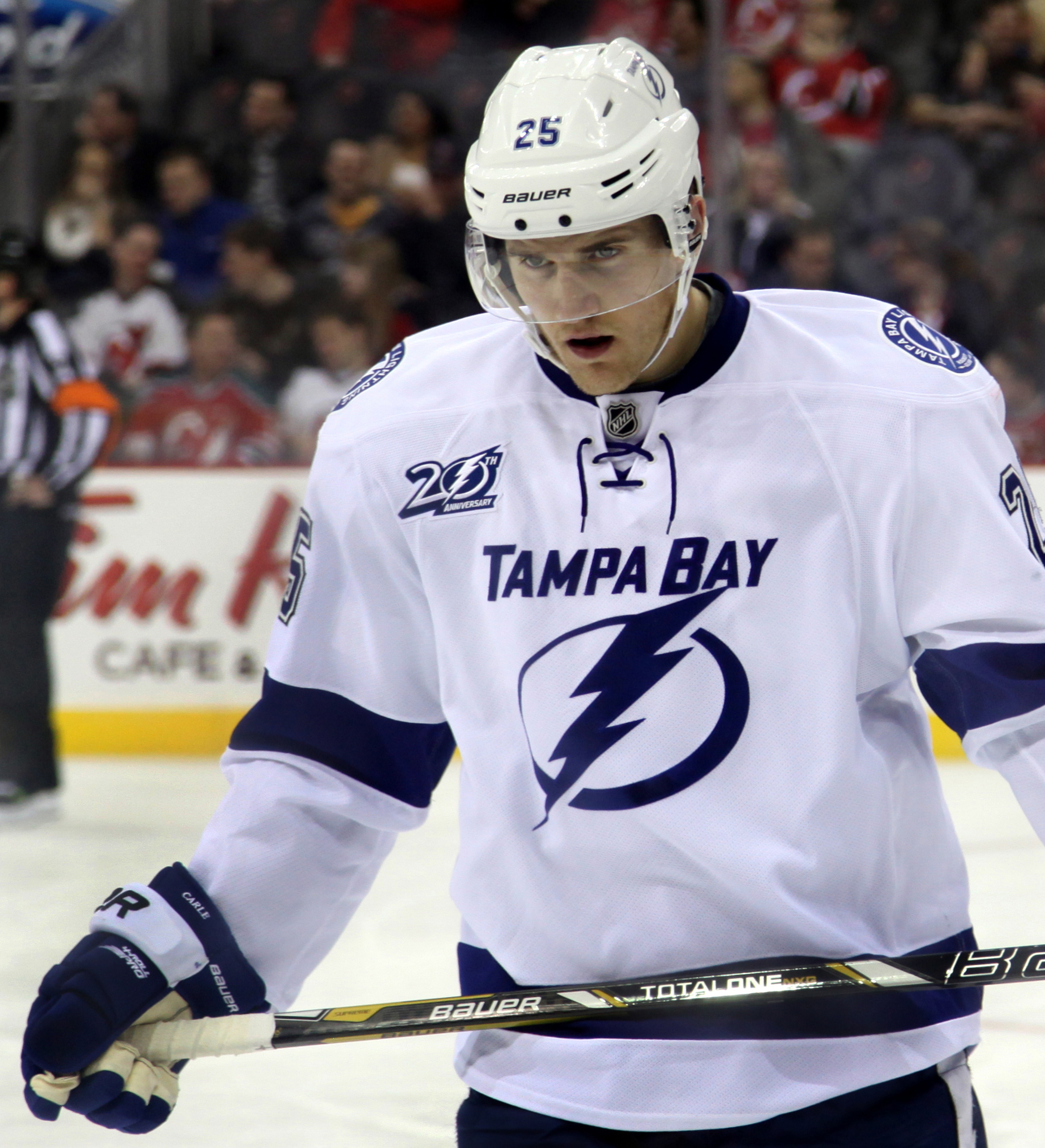
- Carle with the Tampa Bay Lightning in February 2013
- Born: September 25, 1984 (age 42) Anchorage, Alaska, U.S.
- Height: 6 ft 0 in (183 cm)
- Weight: 197 lb (89 kg; 14 st 1 lb)
- Position: Defense
- Shot: Left
- Played for: San Jose Sharks; Tampa Bay Lightning; Philadelphia Flyers; Nashville Predators
- National team: United States
- NHL draft: 47th overall, 2003; San Jose Sharks
- Playing career: 2005–2016

Matthew Carle (born September 25, 1984) is an American former professional ice hockey defenseman. Carle played in the National Hockey League (NHL) with the San Jose Sharks, Tampa Bay Lightning, Philadelphia Flyers and Nashville Predators. He was originally drafted by the San Jose Sharks in the second round, 47th overall, in 2003.

Prior to turning professional, Carle played for the University of Denver where he was named NCAA Defenseman of the Year, NCAA All-American Team (West), First All-WCHA Team, USCHO First Team All American, and First Team All American. During the 2005–06 season, he also received the Hobey Baker Award as the top National Collegiate Athletic Association men's ice hockey player.

== Playing career ==
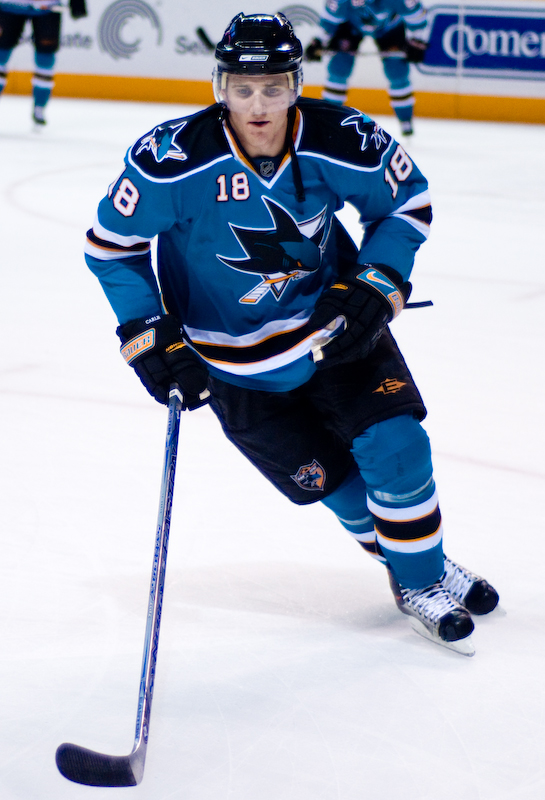
Carle spent his first three NHL seasons with the San Jose Sharks.

=== Amateur ===
As a youth, Carle played in the 1998 Quebec International Pee-Wee Hockey Tournament with a minor ice hockey team from Alaska.

Carle played for the River City Lancers in the USHL during the 2002–03 season. Carle was drafted 47th overall in the second round of the 2003 NHL entry draft by the San Jose Sharks. Instead of turning professional, Carle began his freshman season at the University of Denver for the 2003–04 season.

While a freshman at the University of Denver, Carle was named to the United States roster for the 2004 World Junior Ice Hockey Championships, where he won gold. He returned to Denver where he helped guide the team to the 2004 NCAA Championship title. Carle became the first United States born player to win a gold medal at the World Junior and the NCAA Championship within the same season. He was also named to the All-WCHA Rookie Team.

In his sophomore season, Carle helped lead the team to another NCAA Championship title and was named the 2004–05 NCAA Defenseman of the Year, NCAA All-American Team (West), First All-WCHA Team, USCHO First Team All American and First Team All American.

In his junior year, Carle was named Denver's captain and ended the season tied third in the WCHA conference in scoring and led all defencemen. He won the Hobey Baker Award in 2006 emblematic of America's top college hockey player as the only player in University of Denver history to win the award. He was also the first player in WCHA history to be named both Player of the Year and Defensive Player of the Year within the same season. Carle was also again named a First Team All-American.

=== Professional ===
To convince Carle to forgo his senior year at Denver, as well as acknowledge Carle's numerous successes, the San Jose Sharks signed Carle to a three-year deal worth approximately US $4.1 million, the maximum an entry-level contract can be worth according to under the then-terms of the NHL Collective Bargaining Agreement (CBA). The contract, a two-way deal, included $942,000 in annual salary as well as a $1.25 million signing bonus.

Carle made his NHL debut, and scored his first NHL goal, on March 25, 2006, against the Minnesota Wild. During his first full season with the Sharks in 2006–07, Carle scored 11 goals and 31 assists in 77 games and was named to the NHL All-Rookie Team. In November 2007, Carle signed a four-year, $13.75 million contract extension with San Jose.

On July 4, 2008, Carle was traded, along with Ty Wishart and a first- and fourth-draft pick in 2009 and 2010, respectively, to the Tampa Bay Lightning in exchange for defensemen Dan Boyle and Brad Lukowich.

On November 7, 2008, just 12 games into Tampa Bay's season, Carle was traded with a 2009 third-round pick to the Philadelphia Flyers in exchange for Steve Eminger, Steve Downie and a 2009 fourth-round pick. Playing the majority of the year paired with Braydon Coburn, Carle scored four goals and 20 assists and finished with a +2 plus-minus in 64 games for the Flyers. During the season, he also missed five games at the start of December with a rib injury.

Carle received a new defense partner when the Flyers traded for Chris Pronger at the 2009 NHL entry draft. The duo immediately established chemistry whilst in training camp and started production early in the season. The Flyers' home opener in the 2009–10 season saw Carle tie the NHL record for assists in a single period by a defenseman with four, all coming in the second period against the Washington Capitals; the amount was also a career-high for Carle. In the game, Carle's passing also helped captain Mike Richards score his second career NHL hat-trick.

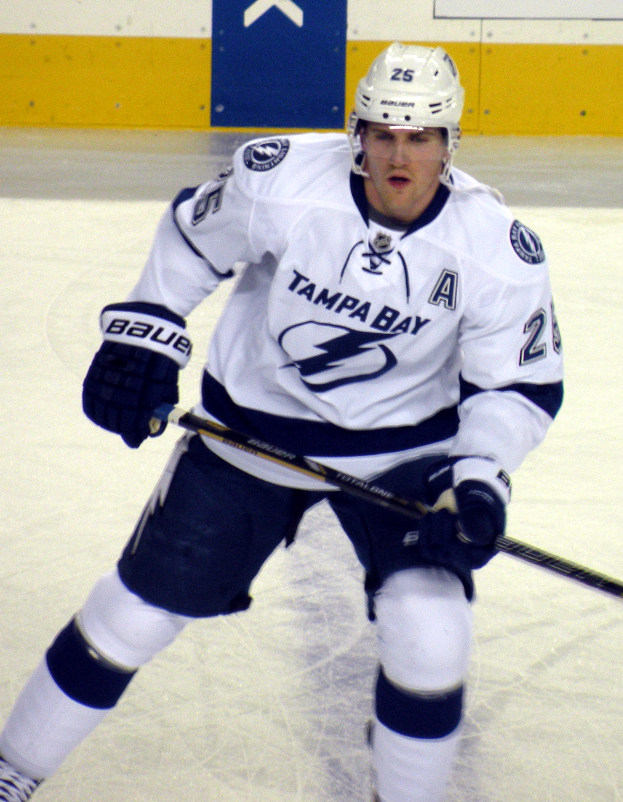
Carle with the Tampa Bay Lightning in January 2014

After four seasons with the Flyers, Carle returned to the Lightning as a free agent on July 4, 2012, signing a six-year, $33 million total. On February 16, 2016, Carle played in his 700th career NHL game, which came in a 2–4 loss to the visiting San Jose Sharks.

With his offensive output dwindling and role reduced with the Lightning, on June 30, 2016, after his fourth season in Tampa Bay, Carle was bought out of the remaining two-year of his contract, making him an unrestricted free agent.

On July 27, 2016, he signed a one-year, $700K deal with the Nashville Predators. In the 2016–17 season, Carle made his Predators debut on the blueline on opening night, Carle appeared in 6 games registering one assist, averaging a shade over 13 minutes before he was relegated to a healthy scratch status from October 26, 2016. On November 24, Carle was placed on waivers and upon clearing was waived unconditionally by Nashville with the intent of terminating his contract on November 25, 2016. Later that day, Carle announced his retirement from his 12-season career in the NHL.

In 2015, Carle was inducted into the Lancers Hall of Fame.

== Personal life ==
Carle's younger brother, David attended Shattuck-Saint Mary's and was initially planning on attending the University of Denver to play college ice hockey, before later being diagnosed with hypertrophic cardiomyopathy, a condition that has been cited in the sudden death of young athletes. Despite his decision to no longer play hockey, the Tampa Bay Lightning drafted him in the seventh round of the 2008 NHL entry draft. Carle serves as the head hockey coach at the University of Denver.

The youngest of the Carle brothers, Alex, plays hockey for Merrimack College. After three successful seasons of high school-level hockey at Kimball Union Academy in New Hampshire, he spent the next season with the Youngstown Phantoms of the United States Hockey League (USHL) before enrolling at Merrimack.

Carle married fellow University of Denver classmate Clancey Kabella in 2010. The couple lives in Clancey's native state of Minnesota during Carle's off-season.

In 2012, Carle appeared in the film This Is 40 alongside then-Philadelphia Flyers teammates Scott Hartnell, James van Riemsdyk and Ian Laperrière.

== Career statistics ==
=== Regular season and playoffs ===
			Regular season					Playoffs
Season	Team	League	GP	G	A	Pts	PIM	GP	G	A	Pts	PIM
2000–01	U.S. NTDP U17	USDP	13	0	1	1		—	—	—	—	—
2000–01	U.S. NTDP U18	NAHL	55	1	4	5	33	—	—	—	—	—
2001–02	U.S. NTDP Juniors	USHL	12	0	0	0	21	—	—	—	—	—
2001–02	U.S. NTDP U17	USDP	7	1	2	3	0	—	—	—	—	—
2001–02	U.S. NTDP U18	USDP	45	3	13	16	30	—	—	—	—	—
2002–03	River City Lancers	USHL	59	12	30	42	98	11	2	2	4	20
2003–04	University of Denver	WCHA	30	5	21	26	33	—	—	—	—	—
2004–05	University of Denver	WCHA	41	12	28	40	62	—	—	—	—	—
2005–06	University of Denver	WCHA	39	11	42	53	58	—	—	—	—	—
2005–06	San Jose Sharks	NHL	12	3	3	6	14	11	0	3	3	4
2006–07	Worcester Sharks	AHL	3	0	2	2	0	—	—	—	—	—
2006–07	San Jose Sharks	NHL	77	11	31	42	30	11	2	3	5	0
2007–08	San Jose Sharks	NHL	62	2	13	15	26	11	0	1	1	4
2008–09	Tampa Bay Lightning	NHL	12	1	1	2	6	—	—	—	—	—
2008–09	Philadelphia Flyers	NHL	64	4	20	24	16	6	0	3	3	4
2009–10	Philadelphia Flyers	NHL	80	6	29	35	16	23	1	12	13	8
2010–11	Philadelphia Flyers	NHL	82	1	39	40	23	11	0	4	4	2
2011–12	Philadelphia Flyers	NHL	82	4	34	38	36	11	2	4	6	6
2012–13	Tampa Bay Lightning	NHL	48	5	17	22	4	—	—	—	—	—
2013–14	Tampa Bay Lightning	NHL	82	2	29	31	28	4	1	0	1	0
2014–15	Tampa Bay Lightning	NHL	59	4	14	18	26	25	0	3	3	4
2015–16	Tampa Bay Lightning	NHL	64	2	7	9	26	14	0	5	5	5
2016–17	Nashville Predators	NHL	6	0	1	1	0	—	—	—	—	—
NHL totals			730	45	238	283	251	127	6	38	44	36

=== International ===
Medal record

Representing the United States

Ice hockey

World Championships
Bronze medal – third place	2013 Sweden/Finland	

World Junior Championships
Gold medal – first place	2004 Helsinki	

World U18 Championships
Gold medal – first place	2002 Trnava	

Year	Team	Event	Result	GP	G	A	Pts	PIM
2002	United States	WJC18	1st place, gold medalist(s)	8	0	3	3	2
2004	United States	WJC	1st place, gold medalist(s)	6	1	0	1	4
2013	United States	WC	3rd place, bronze medalist(s)	10	0	2	2	2
Junior totals				14	1	3	4	6
Senior totals				10	0	2	2	2

== Awards and honors ==
Award	Year
College
All-WCHA Rookie Team	2003–04
All-WCHA First Team	2004–05, 2005–06
AHCA West First-Team All-American	2004–05, 2005–06
All-NCAA All-Tournament Team	2005
Hobey Baker Award	2005–06
NHL
NHL All-Rookie Team	2006–07

Awards and achievements
Preceded by Mark Stuart	WCHA Defensive Player of the Year; 2005–06	Succeeded by Alex Goligoski
Preceded by Marty Sertich	WCHA Player of the Year; 2005–06	Succeeded by Ryan Duncan
Preceded by Marty Sertich	Winner of the Hobey Baker Award; 2005–06	Succeeded by Ryan Duncan
