= 2007–08 AHL season =

- League: American Hockey League
- Sport: Ice hockey
- Duration: October 3, 2007 - April 13, 2008

Regular season
- Macgregor Kilpatrick Trophy: Providence Bruins
- Season MVP: Jason Krog (Chicago)
- Top scorer: Jason Krog (Chicago)

Playoffs
- Playoffs MVP: Jason Krog (Chicago)

Calder Cup
- Champions: Chicago Wolves
- Runners-up: Wilkes-Barre/Scranton Penguins

AHL seasons
- 2006–07 2008–09

The 2007–08 AHL season was the 72nd season of the American Hockey League. Twenty-nine teams played 80 games each in the schedule. The Chicago Wolves won their second Calder Cup, defeating the Wilkes-Barre/Scranton Penguins in the Calder Cup Final.

== Team changes ==
- The dormant Utah Grizzlies relocate to Cleveland, Ohio, playing as the Lake Erie Monsters in the North Division.
- The dormant Cincinnati Mighty Ducks relocate to Rockford, Illinois, playing as the Rockford IceHogs in the West Division, using the name of a previous United Hockey League franchise.
- The Omaha Ak-Sar-Ben Knights relocate to Moline, Illinois (Quad Cities), playing as the Quad City Flames in the West Division.

== Final standings ==
Complete standings available here.

- y– indicates team clinched division and a playoff spot
- x– indicates team clinched a playoff spot
- e– indicates team was eliminated from playoff contention

=== Eastern Conference ===
Atlantic Division	GP	W	L	OTL	SOL	Pts	GF	GA
y–Providence Bruins (BOS)	80	55	18	3	4	117	280	206
x–Hartford Wolf Pack (NYR)	80	50	20	2	8	110	266	198
x–Portland Pirates (ANA)	80	45	26	5	4	99	238	215
x–Manchester Monarchs (LAK)	80	39	31	5	5	88	240	228
e–Springfield Falcons (EDM)	80	35	35	5	5	80	214	257
e–Worcester Sharks (SJS)	80	32	37	5	6	75	216	258
e–Lowell Devils (NJD)	80	25	43	7	5	62	183	270

East Division	GP	W	L	OTL	SOL	Pts	GF	GA
y–Wilkes-Barre/Scranton Penguins (PIT)	80	47	26	3	4	101	223	187
x–Philadelphia Phantoms (PHI)	80	46	27	4	3	99	236	212
x–Albany River Rats (CAR)	80	43	30	3	4	93	213	198
x–Hershey Bears (WSH)	80	42	30	2	6	92	253	247
e–Bridgeport Sound Tigers (NYI)	80	40	36	1	3	84	225	240
e–Binghamton Senators (OTT)	80	34	32	9	5	82	225	248
e–Norfolk Admirals (TBL)	80	29	44	2	5	65	213	267

=== Western Conference ===
North Division	GP	W	L	OTL	SOL	Pts	GF	GA
y–Toronto Marlies (TOR)	80	50	21	3	6	109	246	203
x–Syracuse Crunch (CBJ)	80	46	26	2	6	100	247	201
x–Manitoba Moose (VAN)	80	46	27	3	4	99	236	197
e–Hamilton Bulldogs (MTL)	80	36	34	3	7	82	208	235
e–Grand Rapids Griffins (DET)	80	31	41	2	6	70	210	245
e–Lake Erie Monsters (COL)	80	26	41	6	7	65	209	276
e–Rochester Americans (BUF/FLA)	80	24	46	6	4	58	197	291

West Division	GP	W	L	OTL	SOL	Pts	GF	GA
y–Chicago Wolves (ATL)	80	53	22	2	3	111	300	226
x–Rockford IceHogs (CHI)	80	44	26	4	6	98	247	231
x–Houston Aeros (MIN)	80	45	29	2	4	96	206	183
x–Milwaukee Admirals (NSH)	80	44	29	4	3	95	231	212
x–San Antonio Rampage (PHX)	80	42	28	3	7	94	238	225
e–Quad City Flames (CGY)	80	38	32	3	7	86	203	214
e–Peoria Rivermen (STL)	80	38	33	4	5	85	247	242
e–Iowa Stars (DAL)	80	35	37	5	3	78	217	255

== Scoring leaders ==
Note: GP = Games played; G = Goals; A = Assists; Pts = Points; PIM = Penalty Minutes

Player	Team	GP	G	A	Pts	PIM
Jason Krog	Chicago Wolves	80	39	73	112	30
Martin St. Pierre	Rockford IceHogs	69	21	67	88	80
Teddy Purcell	Manchester Monarchs	67	25	58	83	34
Pierre-Alexandre Parenteau	Hartford Wolf Pack	75	34	47	81	73
Cal O'Reilly	Milwaukee Admirals	80	16	63	79	22
Brad Moran	Manitoba Moose	74	22	55	77	44
Jeff Tambellini	Bridgeport Sound Tigers	57	38	38	76	38
Rob Schremp	Springfield Falcons	78	23	53	76	64
Pascal Pelletier	Providence Bruins	73	37	38	75	66
Grant Stevenson	Quad City Flames	80	30	43	73	58

== Calder Cup playoffs ==
In each division, the fourth-place team will play the first-place team in the division semifinals, while the second-place team plays the third-place team.

There is one possible exception to the qualification rules in 2007–08: if the fifth-place team in the West Division finishes with more points than the fourth-place team in the North Division, it would cross over and compete in the North Division playoffs. Thus, the San Antonio Rampage replace the Hamilton Bulldogs in the North Division playoffs.

Division Semi-finals	Division Finals
A1	Providence	4
A4	Manchester	0
A1	Providence	2
Atlantic Division
A3	Portland	4
A2	Hartford	1
A3	Portland	4
Eastern Conference
E1	Wilkes-Barre/Scranton	4
E4	Hershey	1
E1	Wilkes-Barre/Scranton	4
East Division
E2	Philadelphia	1
E2	Philadelphia	4
E3	Albany	3
N1	Toronto	4
W5	San Antonio	3
N1	Toronto	4
North Division
N2	Syracuse	3
N2	Syracuse	4
N3	Manitoba	2
Western Conference
W1	Chicago	4
W4	Milwaukee	2
W1	Chicago	4
West Division
W2	Rockford	3
W2	Rockford	4
W3	Houston	1

Conference Finals
A3	Portland	3
E1	Wilkes-Barre/Scranton	4
N1	Toronto	1
W1	Chicago	4

Calder Cup Final
E1	Wilkes-Barre/Scranton	2
W1	Chicago	4

== All Star Classic ==
The 21st AHL All-Star Classic was played at the Broome County Veterans Memorial Arena in Binghamton, New York, on January 28, 2008. The Canadian All-Stars defeated the Planet USA All-Stars 9–8 in a shootout. Teddy Purcell scored a hat trick, scored the winning shootout goal, and was awarded the MVP award.

	Planet USA All-Stars	Canadian All-Stars
Coach:	Don Lever	Scott Gordon
Assistant coach:	Ron Wilson	Rob Murray
Starters:	(United States) #9 F Bobby Ryan (Portland Pirates) (United States) #29 F Brett Sterling (Chicago Wolves) (Sweden) #37 F Joakim Lindstrom (Syracuse Crunch) (United States) #5 D Erik Reitz (Houston Aeros) (United States) #21 D Matt Lashoff (Providence Bruins) (Finland) #30 G Tuukka Rask (Providence Bruins)	(Canada) #29 G Michael Leighton (Albany River Rats) (Canada) #62 F Teddy Purcell (Manchester Monarchs) (Canada) #39 F Martin St. Pierre (Rockford Icehogs) (Canada) #45 D Alexandre Picard (Philadelphia Phantoms) (Canada) #28 D Lawrence Nycholat (Binghamton Senators) (Canada) #17 F Denis Hamel (Binghamton Senators, captain)
Reserves:	(United States) #3 D Peter Harrold (Manchester Monarchs) (United States) #4 D Clay Wilson (Syracuse Crunch) (Czech Republic) #10 F Petr Vrana (Lowell Devils) (United States) #12 F Joe Motzko (Hershey Bears) (United States) #13 D Alex Goligoski (Wilkes-Barre/Scranton Penguins) (United States) #15 F Greg Moore (Hartford Wolf Pack) (United States) #17 F T. J. Hensick (Lake Erie Monsters) (United States) #19 F Toby Petersen (Iowa Stars) (United States) #24 D Brian Salcido (Portland Pirates) (United States) #28 F Gabe Gauthier (Manchester Monarchs) (United States) #33 G Jimmy Howard (Grand Rapids Griffins) (Finland) #35 G Pekka Rinne (Milwaukee Admirals) (United States) #44 F Rob Schremp (Springfield Falcons) (Sweden) #52 D Jonathan Ericsson (Grand Rapids Griffins) (United States) #11 F Keith Aucoin (Albany River Rats, captain) (United States) #8 D Brian Lee (Binghamton Senators)	(Canada) #1 G Drew MacIntyre (Manitoba Moose) (Canada) #2 D Adam Pardy (Quad City Flames) (Canada) #4 D Brett Skinner (Providence Bruins) (Canada) #7 F Jeff Tambellini (Bridgeport Sound Tigers) (Canada) #8 D Joel Kwiatkowski (Chicago Wolves) (Canada) #10 F Jason Krog (Chicago Wolves) (Canada) #12 F Andrew Ebbett (Portland Pirates) (Canada) #14 F Joey Tenute (San Antonio Rampage) (Canada) #19 F Justin Keller (Norfolk Admirals) (Canada) #25 D Micki DuPont (Peoria Rivermen) (Canada) #26 F Mark Mancari (Rochester Americans) (Canada) #27 F Mike Iggulden (Worcester Sharks) (Canada) #31 G Nolan Schaefer (Houston Aeros) (Canada) #38 D Derrick Walser (Toronto Marlies) (Canada) #84 F Corey Locke (Hamilton Bulldogs)

== Trophy and award winners ==
=== Team awards ===
Calder Cup; Playoff champions:	Chicago Wolves
Richard F. Canning Trophy; Eastern Conference playoff champions:	Wilkes-Barre/Scranton Penguins
Robert W. Clarke Trophy; Western Conference playoff champions:	Chicago Wolves
Macgregor Kilpatrick Trophy; Regular season champions, League:	Providence Bruins
Frank Mathers Trophy; Regular Season champions, Eastern Conference:	Providence Bruins
Norman R. "Bud" Poile Trophy; Regular Season champions, Western Conference:	Chicago Wolves
Emile Francis Trophy; Regular Season champions, Atlantic Division:	Providence Bruins
F. G. "Teddy" Oke Trophy; Regular Season champions, East Division:	Wilkes-Barre/Scranton Penguins
Sam Pollock Trophy; Regular Season champions, North Division:	Toronto Marlies
John D. Chick Trophy; Regular Season champions, West Division:	Chicago Wolves

=== Individual awards ===
Les Cunningham Award; Most valuable player:	Jason Krog - Chicago Wolves
John B. Sollenberger Trophy; Top point scorer:	Jason Krog - Chicago Wolves
Willie Marshall Award; Top goal scorer:	Jason Krog - Chicago Wolves
Dudley "Red" Garrett Memorial Award; Rookie of the year:	Teddy Purcell - Manchester Monarchs
Eddie Shore Award; Defenceman of the year:	Andrew Hutchinson - Hartford Wolf Pack
Aldege "Baz" Bastien Memorial Award; Best Goaltender:	Michael Leighton - Albany River Rats
Harry "Hap" Holmes Memorial Award; Lowest goals against average:	Nolan Schaefer & Barry Brust - Houston Aeros
Louis A. R. Pieri Memorial Award; Coach of the year:	Scott Gordon - Providence Bruins
Fred T. Hunt Memorial Award; Sportsmanship / Perseverance:	Jordan Sigalet - Providence Bruins
Yanick Dupre Memorial Award; Community Service Award:	Denis Hamel - Binghamton Senators
Jack A. Butterfield Trophy; MVP of the playoffs:	Jason Krog - Chicago Wolves

== See also ==
- List of AHL seasons
- 2007 in ice hockey
- 2008 in ice hockey

Preceded by 2006–07 AHL season	AHL seasons	Succeeded by 2008–09 AHL season
