= Iowa Stars =

Former Des Moines, Iowa ice hockey team

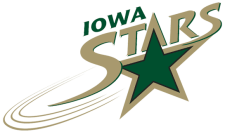
- City: Des Moines, Iowa
- League: American Hockey League
- Operated: 2005–2008 (Iowa Stars); 2008–2009 (Iowa Chops)
- Home arena: Wells Fargo Arena
- Colors: Green, wheat, black, white (2005–2008) Black, crimson, grey, white (2008–2009)
- Affiliates: Dallas Stars (2005–2008); Anaheim Ducks (2008–2009)

Franchise history
- 1999–2001: Louisville Panthers
- 2005–2008: Iowa Stars
- 2008–2009: Iowa Chops
- 2009–present: Texas Stars

The Iowa Stars, later known as the Iowa Chops, were a professional ice hockey team in the American Hockey League. The club was based in Des Moines, Iowa at the Wells Fargo Arena.

== History ==
The Stars were founded by Howard Baldwin, of Hockey Holdings & Management Group, and Dallas businessman Bob Schlegel, who took the dormant Louisville Panthers AHL franchise and resurrected it for the 2005–06 season as the Iowa Stars (the same name as an earlier team in 1969–70 in the Central Hockey League). They had a five-year affiliation agreement with the Dallas Stars and a one-year agreement with the Anaheim Ducks.

In their inaugural season, the Stars made it to the Calder Cup playoffs first round, where they were defeated by the Milwaukee Admirals. The Stars won their first playoff series the following season, defeating the Omaha Ak-Sar-Ben Knights in six games.

In February 2008, the Dallas Stars announced they would be affiliating with the future Texas Stars pending the 2009 completion of the Cedar Park Entertainment Center in Cedar Park, Texas. After the 2007–08 AHL season, the Dallas Stars left the Iowa scene, and the Anaheim Ducks announced an affiliation with the team.

Logo of the Iowa Chops (2008–09)

On July 9, 2008, the team unveiled its new name and logo, featuring a "vicious boar’s head in the team colors of crimson, grey and black".

Portland Pirates assistant Gord Dineen was named head coach of the Iowa Chops on August 19, 2008.

On May 9, 2009, the Anaheim Ducks dropped their affiliation with the Chops, leaving Iowa to look for their third NHL affiliate in four seasons.

On July 7, 2009, the Iowa Chops franchise was suspended by the AHL's Board of Governors for the 2009-10 AHL season for being "unable to remedy certain violations of the provisions of the league’s Constitution and By-Laws." While the AHL declined further comment on the reasons for the suspension, the Des Moines Register reported in June, 2009, that the Chops had violated league rules by pledging the team as collateral for a $1.99 million loan from Wachovia. The Register also reported that the Ducks had dropped their affiliation with the Chops after the Chops missed payments on their affiliation contract.

After several months of speculation as to their future, the AHL announced on May 4, 2010, that the Texas Stars had acquired the Chops franchise. This transaction finalized the Stars' contractual obligation to acquire a permanent franchise in the league, as they operated in 2009–10 as an expansion team under a provisional agreement to obtain an existing franchise license.

== Season-by-season results ==
=== Regular season ===
| Season | Games | Won | Lost | OTL | SOL | Points | Goals for | Goals against | Standing |
|---|---|---|---|---|---|---|---|---|---|
| 2005–06 | 80 | 41 | 31 | 1 | 7 | 90 | 238 | 228 | 4th, West |
| 2006–07 | 80 | 42 | 34 | 3 | 1 | 88 | 221 | 231 | 4th, West |
| 2007–08 | 80 | 35 | 37 | 5 | 3 | 78 | 217 | 255 | 8th, West |
| 2008–09 | 80 | 33 | 33 | 4 | 10 | 80 | 209 | 260 | 7th, West |

=== Playoffs ===
| Season | 1st round | 2nd round | 3rd round | Finals |
|---|---|---|---|---|
| 2005–06 | L, 3–4, Milwaukee | — | — | — |
| 2006–07 | W, 4–2, Omaha | L, 2–4, Chicago | — | — |
| 2007–08 | did not qualify. | | | |
| 2008–09 | did not qualify. | | | |

== Team records ==
=== Single game ===
Goals: 4 (Czech Republic) Vojtech Polak (2006–07)
Penalty Minutes: 32 (United States) David Berube (2005–06)

=== Single season ===
Goals: 35 (Sweden) Loui Eriksson (2005–06)
Assists: 47 (United States) Toby Petersen (2005–06)
Points: 73 (United States) Toby Petersen (2005–06)
Penalty Minutes: 189 (Canada) Brennan Evans (2008–09)
GAA: 2.5 (Canada) Mike Smith (2005–06)
SV%: .917 (Canada) Mike Smith (2005–06)

=== Career ===
Career Goals: 49 (United States) Toby Petersen (2005–08)
Career Assists: 83 (United States) Toby Petersen (2005–08)
Career Points: 132 (United States) Toby Petersen (2005–08)
Career Penalty Minutes: 189 (Canada) Brennan Evans (2008–09)
Career Goaltending Wins: 25 (Canada) Mike Smith (2005–06)
Career Shutouts: 3 (Canada) Mike Smith (2005–06)
Career Games: 132 (Sweden) Yared Hagos (2005–07)

=== American Hockey League Hall of Famers ===
AHL Hall of Fame Honored Members
| Name | Seasons | Induction Year |
|---|---|---|
| Nolan Baumgartner | 2007-08 (player) | 2022 |

Affiliates

- Edmonton Oilers (2005-2006)
- Dallas Stars (2005-2008)
- Anaheim Ducks (2008-2009)
