= Jordan Sisco =

Canadian gridiron football player (born 1988)

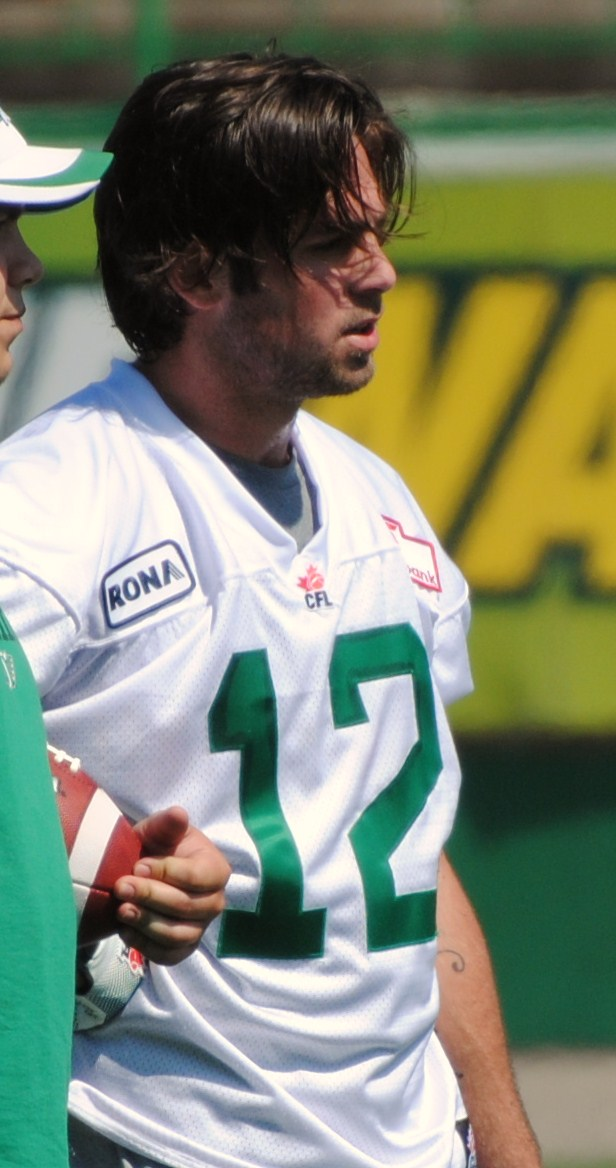

No. 12
- Position: Wide receiver

Personal information
- Born: February 24, 1988 (age 38); Regina, Saskatchewan, Canada
- Listed height: 6 ft 0 in (1.83 m)
- Listed weight: 212 lb (96 kg)

Career information
- High school: Regina (SK) Riffel
- University: Regina
- CFL draft: 2010: 2nd round, 8th overall pick

Career history
- Indianapolis Colts (2010)*; Saskatchewan Roughriders (2010–2014)
- * Offseason or practice squad member only
- Stats at CFL.ca (archive)

Jordan Christopher Sisco (born February 24, 1988) is a Canadian former professional gridiron football player who was a wide receiver for the Saskatchewan Roughriders of the Canadian Football League (CFL).

== Football career ==
=== Amateur ===
Sisco played high school football for the Riffel Royals before going to university. He played four years of university football for the Rams at the University of Regina. In 30 career Canada West games with the Rams, Sisco had 141 catches for 2051 yards and 11 touchdown receptions to go along with eight rushing majors. His best season with the Rams was in 2009, when he led the conference in receptions with 53 and in receiving yards with 700. In his first year with the Rams, Sisco was named the club's Rookie of the Year. In 2008 and 2009, he was named a Canada West All-Star, and the team's top receiver.

=== Professional ===
After Sisco's 2009 season, he was selected by the Saskatchewan Roughriders in the second round (eighth overall) of the 2010 Canadian Football League (CFL) Draft. Before he could join the Riders, Sisco signed a free agent contract with the Indianapolis Colts of the National Football League (NFL). In August, before the Colts main training camp, Sisco was released by the team. After his release, Sisco signed a practice roster agreement with the Saskatchewan Roughriders.
