= RCSD =

RCSD may refer to:

- Redwood City School District
- Regina Catholic School Division
- Rochester City School District
