= Chris Kunitz =

Canadian ice hockey player (born 1979)

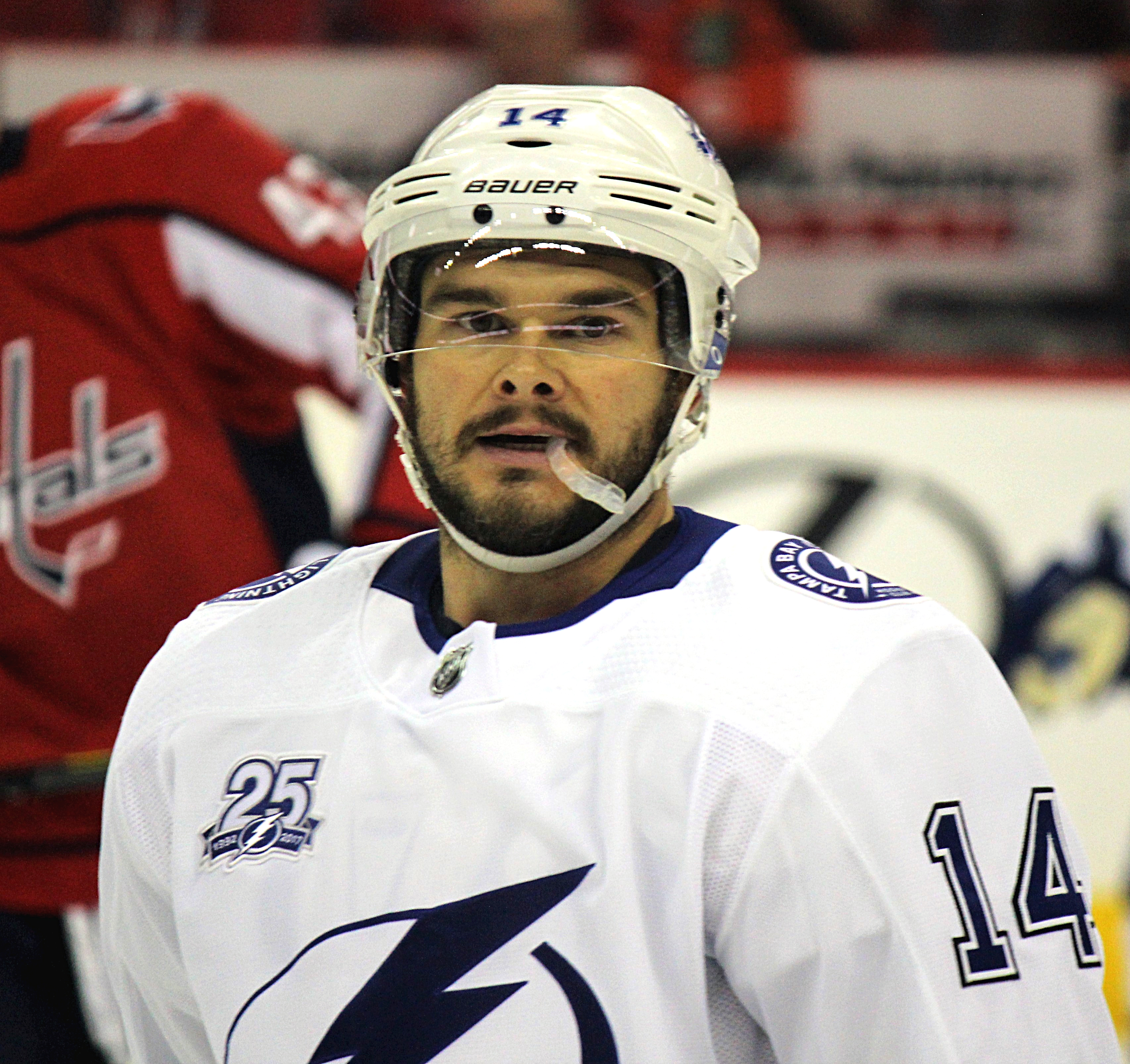
- Kunitz with the Tampa Bay Lightning in 2018
- Born: September 26, 1979 (age 47) Regina, Saskatchewan, Canada
- Height: 6 ft 1 in (185 cm)
- Weight: 188 lb (85 kg; 13 st 6 lb)
- Position: Left wing
- Shot: Left
- Played for: Anaheim Ducks; Atlanta Thrashers; Pittsburgh Penguins; Tampa Bay Lightning; Chicago Blackhawks
- National team: Canada
- NHL draft: Undrafted
- Playing career: 2003–2019
Medal record
Representing Canada
Men's ice hockey
Olympic Games
| Gold medal – first place | 2014 Sochi |
World Championships
| Silver medal – second place | 2008 Canada |

Christopher Kunitz (born September 26, 1979) is a Canadian former professional ice hockey winger who played in the National Hockey League (NHL). He played for the Anaheim Ducks (where he won his first Stanley Cup in 2007), Atlanta Thrashers, the Pittsburgh Penguins (where he won his second, third and fourth Stanley Cup in 2009, 2016 and 2017), Tampa Bay Lightning and Chicago Blackhawks.

Internationally, Kunitz won a gold medal with Team Canada at the 2014 Winter Olympics.

== Playing career ==
=== College and junior ===
Kunitz played Junior A in the Saskatchewan Junior Hockey League (SJHL) with the Melville Millionaires for two seasons before joining the NCAA college ranks with the Ferris State Bulldogs in 1999–00. After a 79-point campaign in his senior year, he was a finalist for the Hobey Baker Award in 2003 (given to Peter Sejna), the same year Ferris State made it to the Division I Regional Finals, just missing out on the Frozen Four. He was part of the first Ferris State team to make an NCAA Tournament appearance (now joined by the 2011–2012, 2013–14, 2015-16 squads).

=== Professional ===
==== Anaheim Ducks, brief stint in Atlanta and return to Anaheim ====
Kunitz was originally signed as an undrafted free agent by the Mighty Ducks of Anaheim on April 1, 2003. He split his professional rookie season between Anaheim and their American Hockey League (AHL) affiliate, the Cincinnati Mighty Ducks. After spending the 2004–05 NHL lock-out with Cincinnati, he was picked up on waivers by the Atlanta Thrashers in 2005–06. Two weeks later, however, he was re-claimed off waivers by the Ducks and went on to play 67 games with them, scoring 19 goals and adding 22 assists for 41 points, surpassing Paul Kariya's club record 39-point rookie season in 1994–95 (Kunitz still qualified as a first-year player because he did not play the minimum required games with Anaheim in 2003–04 to register as his NHL rookie season; the record was broken the following season by Dustin Penner's 45 points).

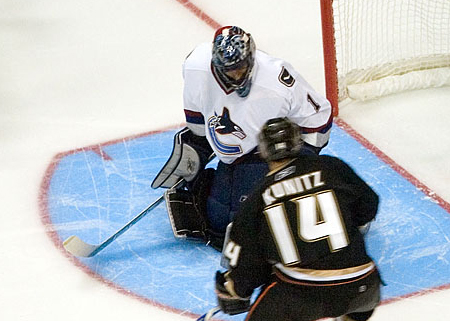
Kunitz at the lip of Roberto Luongo's crease in September 2006

In the 2006–07 NHL season, Kunitz improved to 25 goals and 60 points. He went on to help the Ducks advance through the playoffs, past the Minnesota Wild, Vancouver Canucks, and Detroit Red Wings, en route to a Final victory against the Ottawa Senators to capture both his and the franchise's first Stanley Cup championship. Kunitz had been injured during the semi-finals against the Red Wings, but returned late in the Stanley Cup Final against Ottawa to help clinch the championship in game five.

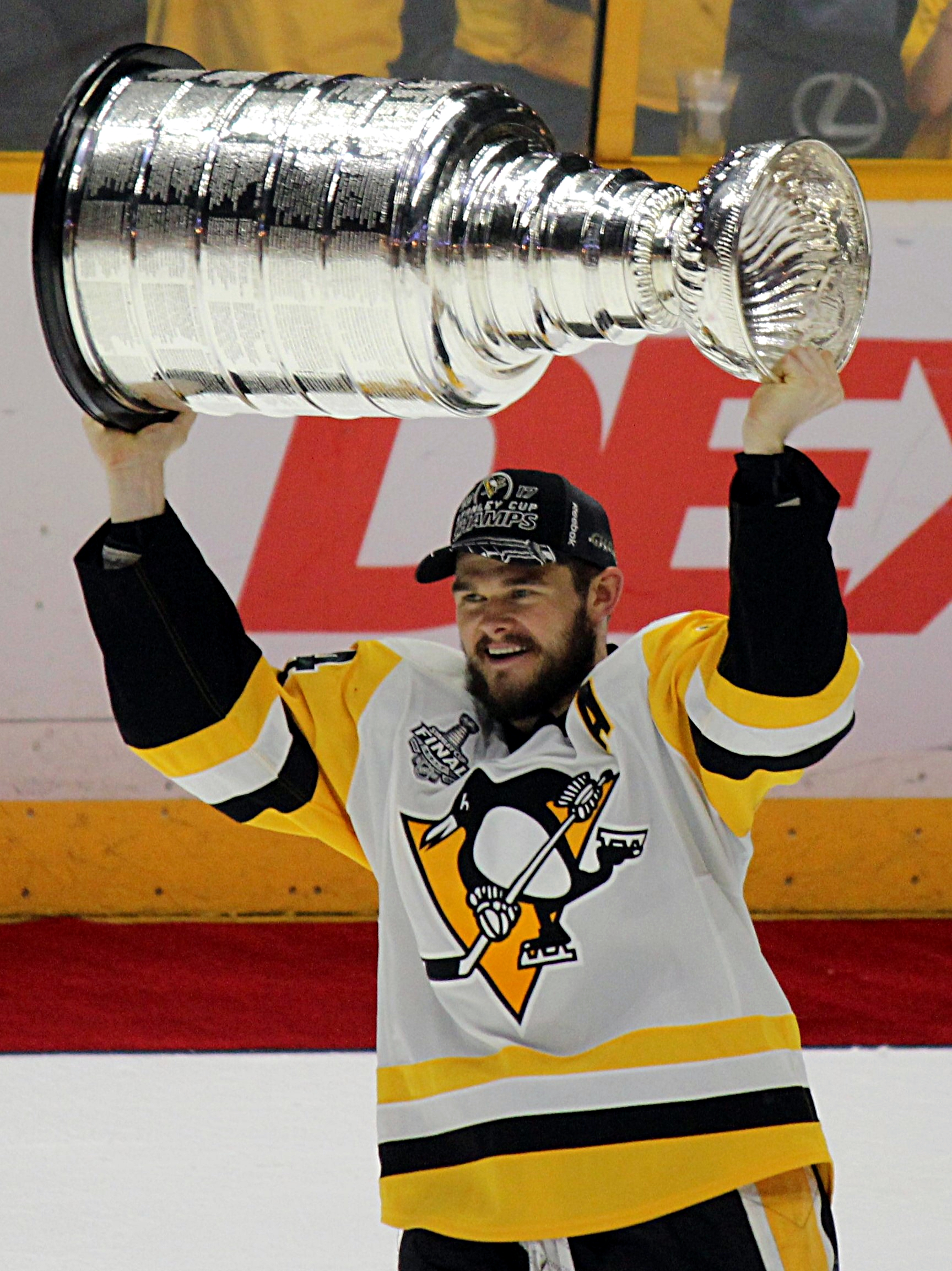
Kunitz in June 2017. He hoisted the Stanley Cup for the fourth time in 2017.

The next season, in 2007–08, Kunitz was named one of the team's alternate captains, his first time with the Ducks and his professional career. In regards to Kunitz' new position, Ducks head coach Randy Carlyle explained, "Rob Niedermayer was an alternate last year and did a fine job, and we thought it was important to involve our younger players in the leadership role. Chris Kunitz fit that role." Kunitz's production dipped to 50 points that season.

==== Pittsburgh Penguins ====
In the midst of another slow season in 2008–09, he was traded to the Pittsburgh Penguins along with prospect Eric Tangradi for defenceman Ryan Whitney. The move was also precipitated by a need for secondary scoring on the Penguins behind Sidney Crosby and Evgeni Malkin. During the 2009 playoffs, he recorded 1 goal and 13 assists as the Pittsburgh Penguins won the Stanley Cup in a rematch of the previous year's Stanley Cup Final against the Detroit Red Wings, giving Kunitz his second championship in three years.

On November 6, 2010, Kunitz played his 400th career game and recorded a goal in that game against the Phoenix Coyotes. On March 15, 2016, he played his 800th career game and recorded a goal against the New York Islanders. In the 2016 Playoffs, he recorded 4 goals and 8 assists for 12 points, as the Penguins went to defeat the San Jose Sharks in six games in 2016. It would be Kunitz's third Stanley Cup of his career, his second with the Pens. Since 2010, he has been a regular member of the Penguins' top lines with Evgeni Malkin and/or Sidney Crosby. On May 25, 2017, Kunitz recorded the last career playoff goal of his career when he scored in double overtime in game seven of the Eastern Conference Finals against the Ottawa Senators; he became the oldest player to score a game seven playoff series winning goal, at age 37. The Penguins faced off against the Nashville Predators in the 2017 Finals, defeating them in six games to successfully defend the Stanley Cup, with Kunitz assisting on the series-winning goal. This marked Kunitz's fourth Stanley Cup of his career, and his third as a member of the Penguins.

==== Tampa Bay Lightning ====
On July 1, 2017, Kunitz left the Penguins as a free agent and signed a one-year, $2 million, contract with the Tampa Bay Lightning. The Lightning announced through its social media account that Kunitz would wear the #14. Kunitz had previously worn the number with the Penguins and the Ducks. Kunitz recorded 13 goals and 29 points during the season, but just one assist in the playoffs as the Lightning lost in the Eastern Conference Final to the eventual champion Washington Capitals in 7 games.

==== Chicago Blackhawks ====
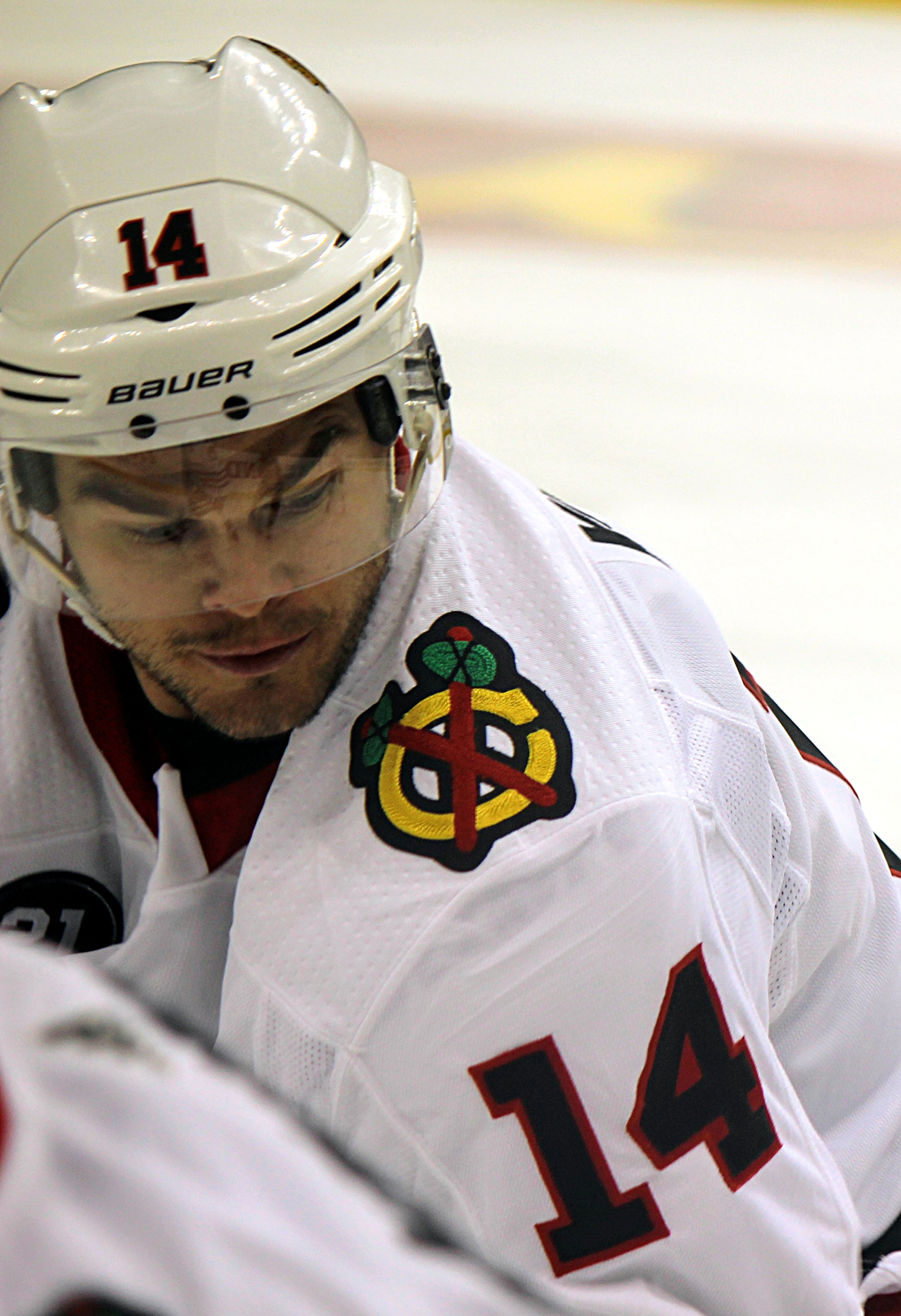
Kunitz with the Blackhawks in January 2019

On July 1, 2018, Kunitz signed a one-year, $1 million contract with the Chicago Blackhawks. He played 56 games and had 5 goals and 10 points.

On July 30, 2019, Kunitz announced his retirement from professional hockey after 15 seasons. He joined the Blackhawks' organization as a player development adviser as well as the coaching staff of their American League affiliate, the Rockford IceHogs.

== International play ==
Kunitz made his international hockey debut for Team Canada at the 2008 World Hockey Championships. He contributed 7 points in 9 games, helping Canada to a silver medal. On January 7, 2014, he was named to the 2014 Canadian Olympic Hockey Team.

== Personal life ==
Kunitz attended Michael A. Riffel High School in northwest Regina, graduating in 1997. Ten years after his graduation, he brought the Stanley Cup back to Riffel in July 2007 when he had his day with the trophy. He also took the Stanley Cup back to his college town (Big Rapids, Michigan) on the same day. On August 11, 2009, Kunitz brought the trophy back to Regina and had a larger celebration in the city's downtown. Kunitz admitted that during his first visit, he had a low-key celebration at Riffel as a result of teammate Ryan Getzlaf's profile.

Kunitz married Chicago-native Maureen Pfeiffer in July 2008. The couple reside with their three children in Chicago. Kunitz and his family lived in the Bridgeville area of Pittsburgh during his tenure with the Penguins.

Kunitz earned a degree in marketing and business from Ferris State University.

== Career statistics ==
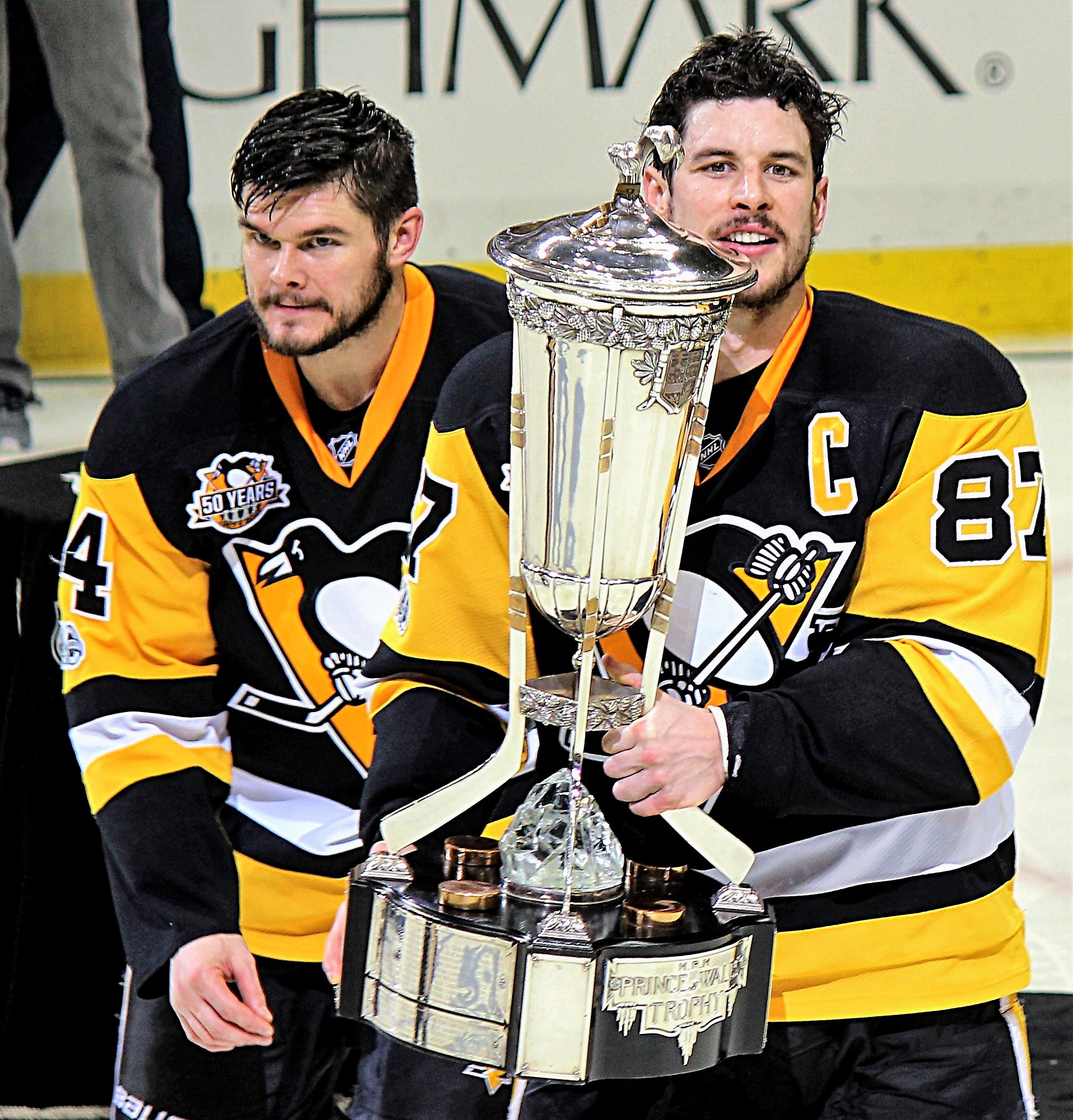
Kunitz with Sidney Crosby receiving the Prince of Wales Trophy in 2017. Kunitz scored the series winning goal in the second overtime of game seven to send the Penguins to the 2017 Stanley Cup Final.

=== Regular season and playoffs ===
| | | | Regular season | | | | | Playoffs |
| Season | Team | League | GP | G | A | Pts | PIM | GP | G | A | Pts | PIM |
|---|---|---|---|---|---|---|---|---|---|---|---|---|
| 1996–97 | Yorkton Mallers AAA | SMHL | 64 | 38 | 38 | 76 | 233 | — | — | — | — | — |
| 1997–98 | Melville Millionaires | SJHL | 60 | 30 | 27 | 57 | 151 | — | — | — | — | — |
| 1998–99 | Melville Millionaires | SJHL | 63 | 57 | 32 | 89 | 222 | 4 | 4 | 1 | 5 | 19 |
| 1999–2000 | Ferris State Bulldogs | CCHA | 38 | 20 | 9 | 29 | 70 | — | — | — | — | — |
| 2000–01 | Ferris State Bulldogs | CCHA | 37 | 16 | 13 | 29 | 81 | — | — | — | — | — |
| 2001–02 | Ferris State Bulldogs | CCHA | 35 | 28 | 10 | 38 | 68 | — | — | — | — | — |
| 2002–03 | Ferris State Bulldogs | CCHA | 42 | 35 | 44 | 79 | 56 | — | — | — | — | — |
| 2003–04 | Mighty Ducks of Anaheim | NHL | 21 | 0 | 6 | 6 | 12 | — | — | — | — | — |
| 2003–04 | Cincinnati Mighty Ducks | AHL | 59 | 19 | 25 | 44 | 101 | 9 | 3 | 2 | 5 | 24 |
| 2004–05 | Cincinnati Mighty Ducks | AHL | 54 | 22 | 17 | 39 | 71 | 12 | 1 | 7 | 8 | 20 |
| 2005–06 | Atlanta Thrashers | NHL | 2 | 0 | 0 | 0 | 2 | — | — | — | — | — |
| 2005–06 | Mighty Ducks of Anaheim | NHL | 67 | 19 | 22 | 41 | 69 | 16 | 3 | 5 | 8 | 8 |
| 2005–06 | Portland Pirates | AHL | 5 | 0 | 4 | 4 | 12 | — | — | — | — | — |
| 2006–07 | Anaheim Ducks | NHL | 81 | 25 | 35 | 60 | 81 | 13 | 1 | 5 | 6 | 19 |
| 2007–08 | Anaheim Ducks | NHL | 82 | 21 | 29 | 50 | 80 | 6 | 0 | 2 | 2 | 8 |
| 2008–09 | Anaheim Ducks | NHL | 62 | 16 | 19 | 35 | 55 | — | — | — | — | — |
| 2008–09 | Pittsburgh Penguins | NHL | 20 | 7 | 11 | 18 | 16 | 24 | 1 | 13 | 14 | 19 |
| 2009–10 | Pittsburgh Penguins | NHL | 50 | 13 | 19 | 32 | 39 | 13 | 4 | 7 | 11 | 8 |
| 2010–11 | Pittsburgh Penguins | NHL | 66 | 23 | 25 | 48 | 47 | 6 | 1 | 0 | 1 | 6 |
| 2011–12 | Pittsburgh Penguins | NHL | 82 | 26 | 35 | 61 | 49 | 6 | 2 | 4 | 6 | 8 |
| 2012–13 | Pittsburgh Penguins | NHL | 48 | 22 | 30 | 52 | 39 | 15 | 5 | 5 | 10 | 6 |
| 2013–14 | Pittsburgh Penguins | NHL | 78 | 35 | 33 | 68 | 66 | 13 | 3 | 5 | 8 | 16 |
| 2014–15 | Pittsburgh Penguins | NHL | 74 | 17 | 23 | 40 | 56 | 5 | 1 | 2 | 3 | 8 |
| 2015–16 | Pittsburgh Penguins | NHL | 80 | 17 | 23 | 40 | 41 | 24 | 4 | 8 | 12 | 15 |
| 2016–17 | Pittsburgh Penguins | NHL | 71 | 9 | 20 | 29 | 36 | 20 | 2 | 9 | 11 | 27 |
| 2017–18 | Tampa Bay Lightning | NHL | 82 | 13 | 16 | 29 | 35 | 17 | 0 | 1 | 1 | 16 |
| 2018–19 | Chicago Blackhawks | NHL | 56 | 5 | 5 | 10 | 23 | — | — | — | — | — |
| NHL totals | | | 1,022 | 268 | 351 | 619 | 746 | 178 | 27 | 66 | 93 | 164 |

=== International ===
| Year | Team | Event | Result | GP | G | A | Pts | PIM |
|---|---|---|---|---|---|---|---|---|
| 2008 | Canada | WC | 2nd place, silver medalist(s) | 9 | 2 | 5 | 7 | 4 |
| 2014 | Canada | OG | 1st place, gold medalist(s) | 6 | 1 | 0 | 1 | 6 |
| Senior totals | | | | 15 | 3 | 5 | 8 | 10 |

== Awards and honours ==
| Awards | Year |
College
| All-CCHA First Team | 2001–02 |
| All-CCHA First Team | 2002–03 |
| AHCA West First-Team All-American | 2002–03 |
| CCHA All-Tournament Team | 2003 |
NHL
| Stanley Cup champion | 2007, 2009, 2016, 2017 |
| First All-Star Team | 2013 |

Awards and achievements
| Preceded by Ryan Miller | CCHA Player of the Year; 2002–03 | Succeeded by Derek Edwardson |
