= Jon Gleed =

Canadian ice hockey player

- Born: January 3, 1984 (age 42) Milton, Ontario, Canada
- Height: 6 ft 2 in (188 cm)
- Weight: 212 lb (96 kg; 15 st 2 lb)
- Position: Defence
- Shot: Right
- Played for: Belfast Giants
- NHL draft: 212th overall, 2004; Montreal Canadiens
- Playing career: 2006–2011

Jon Gleed (born January 3, 1984) is a Canadian former professional ice hockey defenceman. He was selected in the seventh round, 212th overall, by the Montreal Canadiens in the 2004 NHL entry draft.

== Awards and honours ==
Award	Year
EIHL First All-Star team	2010–11

== Career statistics ==
			Regular season					Playoffs
Season	Team	League	GP	G	A	Pts	PIM	GP	G	A	Pts	PIM
2000–01	Brampton Capitals	OPJHL	46	2	13	15	33	—	—	—	—	—
2001–02	Brampton Capitals	OPJHL	45	3	15	18	39	—	—	—	—	—
2002–03	Cornell University	ECAC	12	0	1	1	10	—	—	—	—	—
2003–04	Cornell University	ECAC	28	3	3	6	18	—	—	—	—	—
2004–05	Cornell University	ECAC	30	1	5	6	43	—	—	—	—	—
2005–06	Cornell University	ECAC	28	1	7	8	26	—	—	—	—	—
2006–07	Hamilton Bulldogs	AHL	8	0	1	1	4	—	—	—	—	—
2006–07	Cincinnati Cyclones	ECHL	40	3	6	9	72	10	1	2	3	12
2007–08	Hamilton Bulldogs	AHL	22	0	2	2	14	—	—	—	—	—
2007–08	Cincinnati Cyclones	ECHL	23	0	5	5	42	20	1	2	3	40
2008–09	Bridgeport Sound Tigers	AHL	23	0	2	2	20	—	—	—	—	—
2008–09	Utah Grizzlies	ECHL	39	1	6	7	45	—	—	—	—	—
2009–10	Bridgeport Sound Tigers	AHL	69	1	14	15	87	5	0	0	0	4
2010–11	Belfast Giants	EIHL	54	11	28	39	107	3	1	0	1	4
2019–20	Dundas Real McCoys	ACH	4	0	0	0	0	5	1	0	1	0
2022–23	Dundas Real McCoys	ACH	6	0	3	3	2	—	—	—	—	—
AHL totals			122	1	19	20	125	5	0	0	0	4
ECHL totals			102	4	17	21	159	30	2	4	6	52
