= Gregory Hogeboom =

Canadian ice hockey player

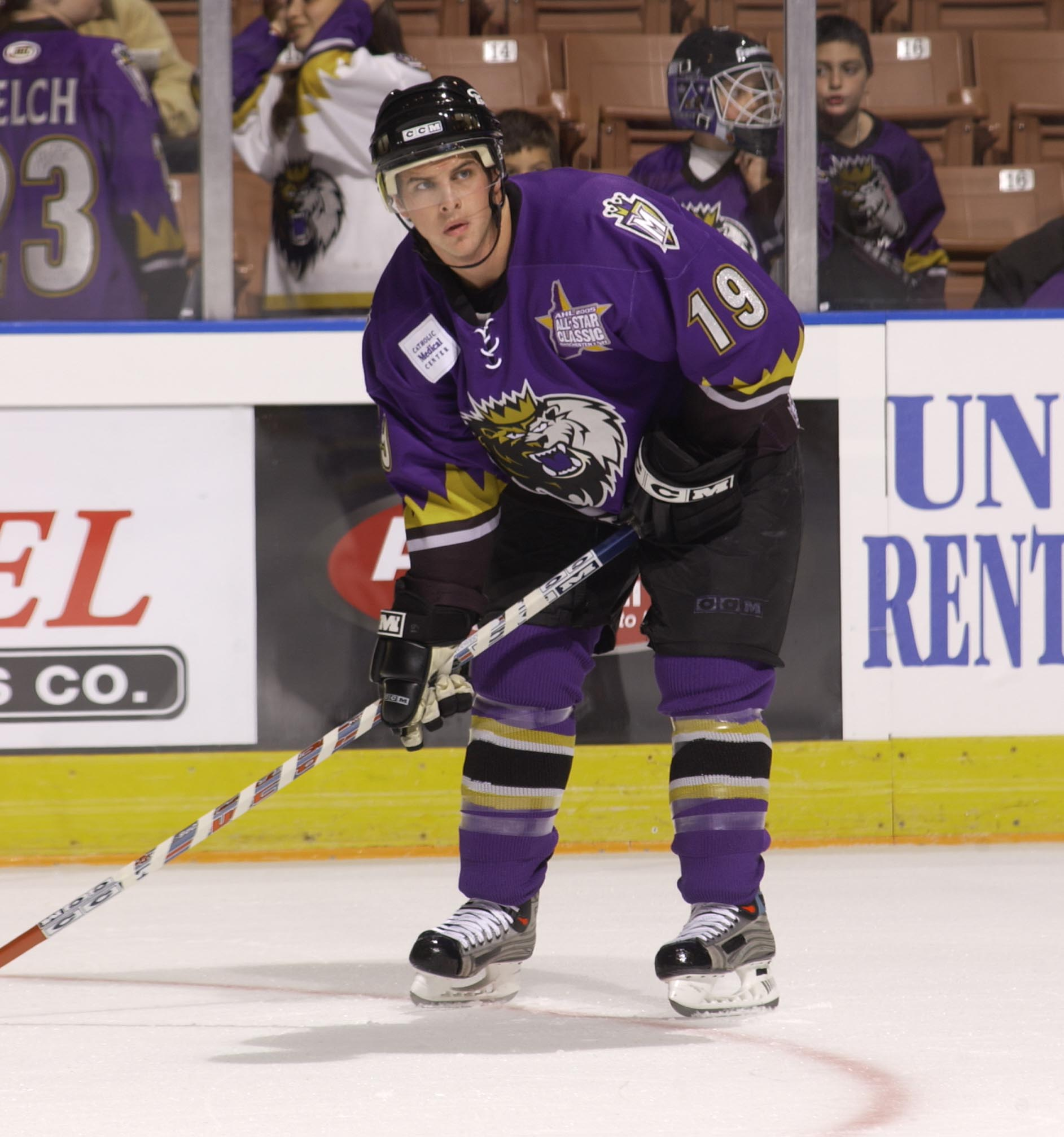
- Hogeboom with the Manchester Monarchs during the 2004–05 season
- Born: September 26, 1982 (age 43) Etobicoke, Ontario, Canada
- Height: 6 ft 0 in (183 cm)
- Weight: 179 lb (81 kg; 12 st 11 lb)
- Position: Forward
- Shot: Right
- Played for: Manchester Monarchs; Reading Royals; Ontario Reign; Texas Brahmas; EHC Visp; HC Thurgau; HC Alleghe; Allen Americans
- NHL draft: 152nd overall, 2002; Los Angeles Kings
- Playing career: 2004–2014

Gregory Hogeboom (born September 26, 1982) is a Canadian former professional ice hockey player. He last played for the Brampton Beast in the Central Hockey League. Hogeboom was selected by the Los Angeles Kings in the 5th round (152nd overall) of the 2002 NHL entry draft.

== College career ==
Hogeboom played junior hockey for the Caledon Canadians and the Wexford Raiders of the Ontario Provincial Junior A Hockey League before signing to play US college hockey for Miami University in Oxford, Ohio, in 2000. At Miami, the RedHawks went the 23–14–4 (.610) in 2003–04 in his senior season to the 2004 NCAA Division I Men's Ice Hockey Tournament, losing 3–2 in the regional semi-final to eventual national champion Denver at the World Arena in Colorado Springs. The team was led by Derek Edwardson (2nd-Team All-American, 48 points) and Hogeboom (42 points). Hogeboom totaled 120 points over 156 games in his Miami career.

== Professional career ==
Graduating from Miami, Hogeboom turned professional and spent the next three seasons in the Kings' farm system with the Reading Royals of the ECHL and the Manchester Monarchs of the American Hockey League, scoring 74 points (30 goals) with Reading in 2006–07. Hogeboom pursued overseas opportunities with the EHC Visp and HC Thurgau of the Swiss National League B for two seasons, before returning to the ECHL in 2009–10 with the Ontario Reign. He had his best professional season with the Texas Brahmas of the Central Hockey League (CHL) in 2010–11 with 91 points (37 goals). Hogeboom returned to Europe for 2011–12 with HC Alleghe of the Italian Hockey League before returning to professional hockey for a three-game stint with the Brampton Beast of the CHL in 2013–14. He retired after the 2013–14 season.

== Personal life ==
Hogeboom graduated with a degree in finance from Miami University and currently works for the La-Z-Boy company in Toronto, Ontario, where he lives with his family.

== Awards and honours ==
Award	Year
All-CCHA Second Team	2003–04

== Career statistics ==
			Regular season					Playoffs
Season	Team	League	GP	G	A	Pts	PIM	GP	G	A	Pts	PIM
1998–99	North York Canadians 18U AAA	GTHL
1998–99	Caledon Canadians	OPJHL	3	0	1	1	2	—	—	—	—	—
1999–2000	Wexford Raiders	OPJHL	48	32	47	79	44	—	—	—	—	—
2000–01	Miami University	CCHA	38	8	5	13	20	—	—	—	—	—
2001–02	Miami University	CCHA	36	14	9	23	22	—	—	—	—	—
2002–03	Miami University	CCHA	41	24	18	42	16	—	—	—	—	—
2003–04	Miami University	CCHA	41	19	23	42	16	—	—	—	—	—
2003–04	Manchester Monarchs	AHL	3	0	1	1	0	—	—	—	—	—
2004–05	Manchester Monarchs	AHL	14	1	0	1	10	—	—	—	—	—
2005–06	Manchester Monarchs	AHL	42	9	10	19	18	1	0	0	0	0
2005–06	Reading Royals	ECHL	19	9	18	27	4	—	—	—	—	—
2006–07	Manchester Monarchs	AHL	15	0	1	1	6	—	—	—	—	—
2006–07	Reading Royals	ECHL	54	30	44	74	43	—	—	—	—	—
2007–08	EHC Visp	SUI.2	49	40	36	76	68	7	4	2	6	31
2008–09	HC Thurgau	SUI.2	45	20	22	42	42	6	2	1	3	4
2009–10	Ontario Reign	ECHL	72	32	27	59	48	—	—	—	—	—
2010–11	Texas Brahmas	CHL	66	37	54	91	34	4	1	2	3	4
2011–12	Alleghe Hockey	ITA	46	29	31	60	26	11	7	11	18	6
2013–14	Brampton Beast	CHL	3	0	1	1	2	—	—	—	—	—
AHL totals			74	10	12	22	34	1	0	0	0	0
ECHL totals			145	71	89	160	95	—	—	—	—	—
