= Derek Edwardson =

American-born Italian ice hockey player

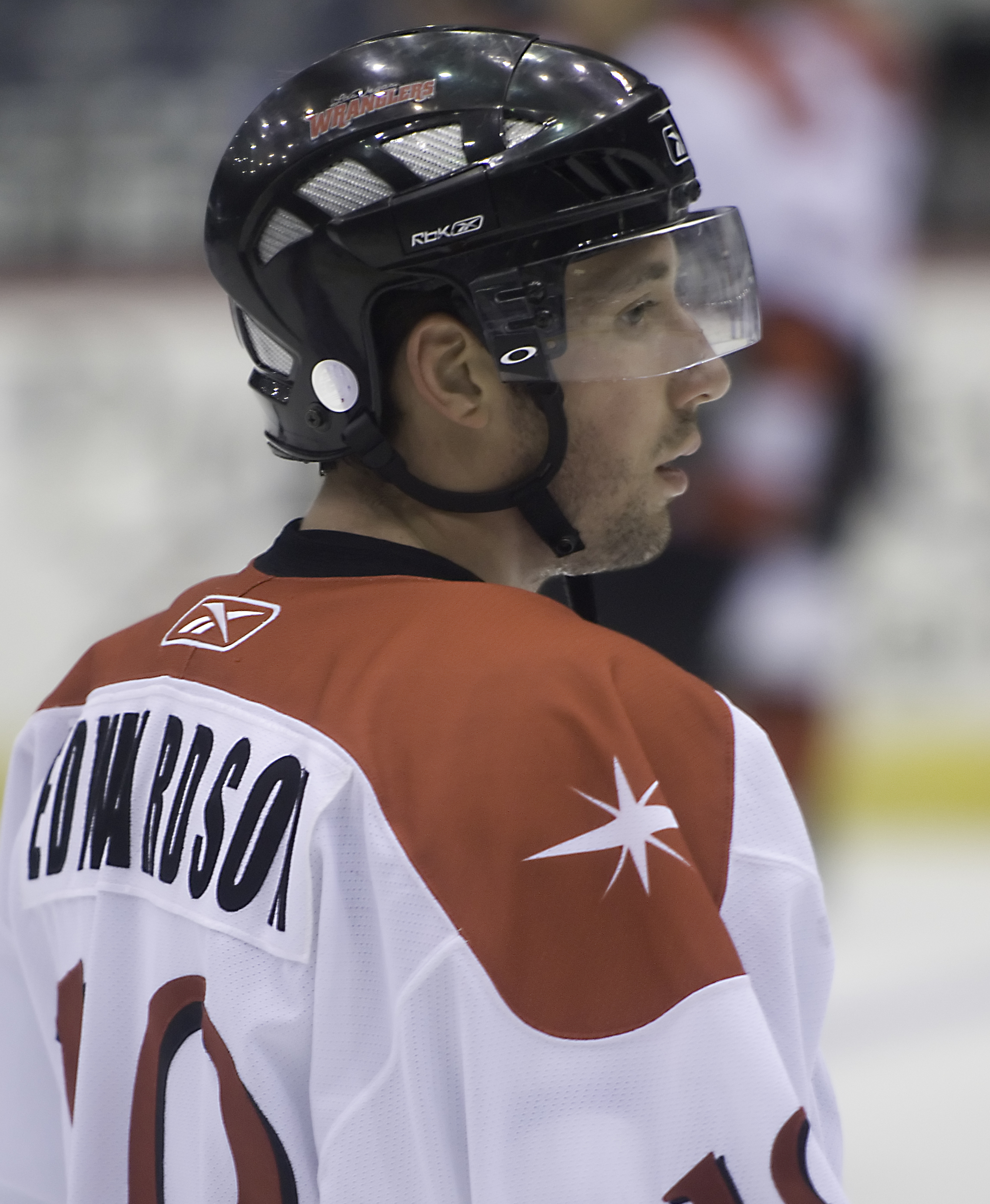
- Born: August 26, 1981 (age 44) Morton Grove, Illinois, U.S.
- Height: 5 ft 8 in (173 cm)
- Weight: 176 lb (80 kg; 12 st 8 lb)
- Position: Forward
- Shot: Right
- Played for: Grand Rapids Griffins; Bridgeport Sound Tigers; Portland Pirates; Milwaukee Admirals; Heilbronner Falken; HC Fassa; HC Bolzano; SG Cortina
- National team: Italy
- NHL draft: Undrafted
- Playing career: 2004–2013

Derek Edwardson (born August 26, 1981) is an American retired professional ice hockey player. He played US college hockey at Miami University and has played in the Italian Serie A.

== College career ==
Edwardson played junior hockey for the Danville Wings of the North American Hockey League for two seasons before committing to play college hockey for Miami University in Oxford, Ohio, in 2000. In his senior 2003–04 season, the team went 23–14–4 (.610) and qualified for the 2004 NCAA Division I Men's Ice Hockey Tournament, losing 3–2 in the regional semi-final to eventual national champions Denver at the World Arena in Colorado Springs. The team was led by Edwardson (2nd-Team All-American, 48 points) and Gregory Hogeboom (42 points). Edwardson was chosen as captain in his senior season, honored as team MVP, and chosen as the CCHA Player of the Year In 2017, Edwardson was inducted into the Miami University Athletics Hall of Fame.

== Professional career ==
Undrafted out of college, Edwardson initially spent extensive time over the next three seasons in the ECHL with the Atlantic City Boardwalk Bullies in 2004–05 (64 points) and the Las Vegas Wranglers in 2005–06 (45 points) and 2006–07 (68 points). Edwardson elected to pursue overseas opportunities, first with Heilbronner Falken in the German DEL2 league for two years, before moving to Italy with HC Fassa for two seasons, HC Bolzano for another, and finally SG Cortina in 2012–13. Edwardson also played for the Italian National Team at the 2012 IIHF World Championship.

Edwardson retired after the 2012–13 season.

== Personal life ==
Edwardson returned to his alma mater as an assistant coach with Miami in 2013–14 and is currently the hockey director of the Indianapolis Youth Hockey Association. He lives in Indianapolis with his family.

== Career statistics ==
			Regular season					Playoffs
Season	Team	League	GP	G	A	Pts	PIM	GP	G	A	Pts	PIM
1998–99	Danville Wings	NAHL	53	19	24	43	43	—	—	—	—	—
1999–00	Danville Wings	NAHL	15	5	14	19	10	—	—	—	—	—
2000–01	Miami University	NCAA	37	6	20	26	18	—	—	—	—	—
2001–02	Miami University	NCAA	36	6	16	22	16	—	—	—	—	—
2002–03	Miami University	NCAA	21	9	15	24	8	—	—	—	—	—
2003–04	Miami University	NCAA	41	17	31	48	36	—	—	—	—	—
2004–05	Atlantic City Boardwalk Bullies	ECHL	69	23	41	64	28	3	0	2	2	6
2004–05	Grand Rapids Griffins	AHL	3	0	0	0	0	—	—	—	—	—
2004–05	Bridgeport Sound Tigers	AHL	2	0	0	0	2	—	—	—	—	—
2005–06	Las Vegas Wranglers	ECHL	53	16	29	45	40	13	3	9	12	12
2005–06	Portland Pirates	AHL	19	4	4	8	6	—	—	—	—	—
2006–07	Las Vegas Wranglers	ECHL	69	27	41	68	49	10	2	7	9	8
2006–07	Milwaukee Admirals	AHL	2	0	0	0	0	—	—	—	—	—
2007–08	Heilbronner Falken	Germany2	52	22	27	49	40	9	3	1	4	4
2008–09	Heilbronner Falken	Germany2	47	9	24	33	55	6	1	2	3	2
2009–10	HC Fassa	Italy	40	17	29	46	34	6	1	1	2	4
2010–11	HC Fassa	Italy	40	21	20	41	34	5	1	3	4	2
2011–12	HC Bolzano	Italy	35	11	18	29	12	3	0	0	0	0
2012–13	SG Cortina	Italy	35	15	23	38	18	12	2	7	9	8
ECHL totals			191	66	111	177	117	26	5	18	23	26

== Awards and achievements ==
Award	Year
All-CCHA First Team	2003–04
AHCA West Second-Team All-American	2003–04

Awards and achievements
Preceded by Chris Kunitz	CCHA Player of the Year; 2003–04	Succeeded by Tuomas Tarkki
