= Miller Comprehensive High School =

High school in Regina, Saskatchewan, Canada

Comprehensive High School
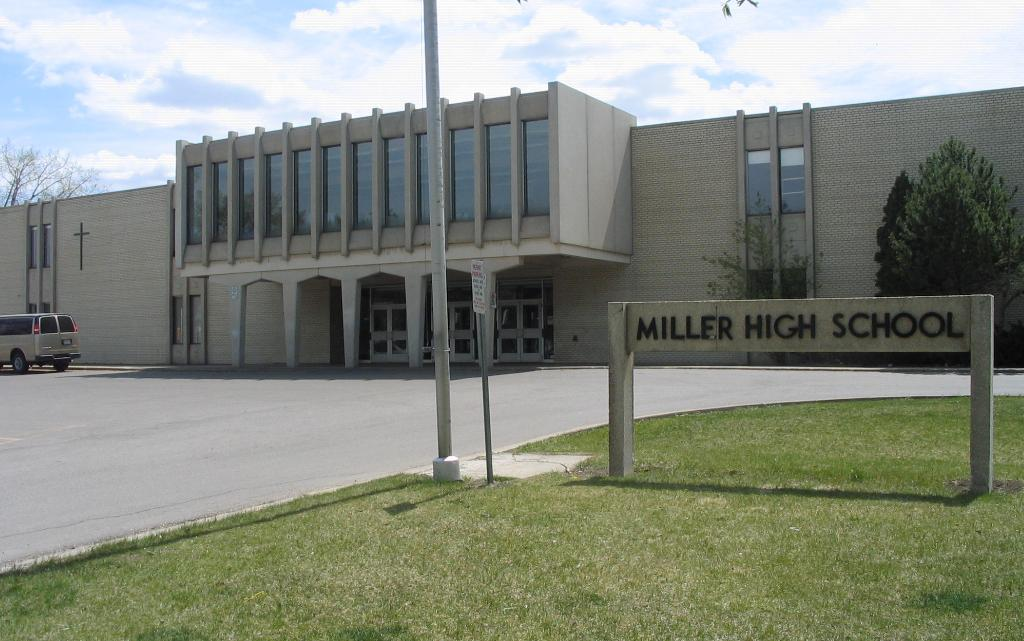

Location
- 1027 College Avenue; Regina, Saskatchewan, S4P 1A7; Canada; 50.43996°N 104.59648°W

Information
- School type: High School
- Motto: We Are Strong Together
- Religious affiliation: Roman Catholic
- Founded: 1966
- School board: Regina Catholic School Division
- Grades: 9-12
- Enrollment: 1400
- Language: English
- Area: Regina
- Colours: Navy, Red and Grey
- Mascot: Marauder Man
- Team name: Miller Marauders
- Website: miller.rcsd.ca

Miller Comprehensive Catholic High School is a Catholic high school located in the Core Group neighbourhood in the central area of Regina, Saskatchewan, Canada. It was the first high school built by the Regina Catholic school system. It is named after Joseph P. Miller who was a longtime member of the school board.

Miller offers several academic and extracurricular opportunities to its students, including an Advanced Placement (AP) program, a regular program, as well as a modified alternative academic program. The Advanced Placement (AP) program allows high school students to enroll in college-level courses and exams, designed to be equivalent to typical first-year university classes. The AP courses offered at Miller are: Calculus, English, Computer Science, Psychology and Studio Art. A number of specialized courses, including automotive, baking, commercial cooking, construction, cosmetology and welding are also available.

Its feeder elementary schools include St. Maria Faustina (formerly Jean Vanier School), St. Augustine Community School, St. Catherine Community School, St. Dominic Savio School, St. Gabriel School, St. Marguerite Bourgeoys School, St. Theresa School, and École St. Elizabeth School.

== Clubs ==
Miller offers the following clubs and activities:

- AV Tech
- Automotive Club
- Beading Club
- Book Club
- Chess Club
- Cooking Club
- Crochet Club
- Drumming Group
- Musical
- Miller Pre-Med Club (HOSA Chapter)
- One Acts
- Outdoor Ed
- Improv
- Knitting Club
- Robotics Club
- SADD (Students Against Distracted Driving)
- Liturgical Team
- Maker Space Club
- Multicultural Club
- Revelation (Liturgical Music Group)
- Student Representative Council
- Unity in Diversity
- We All Matter (WAM)
- Yearbook

== Sports ==
Miller Comprehensive High School hosts the following sports teams:

- Badminton
- Basketball
- Cricket
- Cross country
- Curling
- Football
- Fencing
- Golf
- Hockey
- Pickleball
- Ping pong
- Rugby union
- Soccer
- Tennis
- Track and field
- Volleyball
- Wrestling

== Notable alumni ==
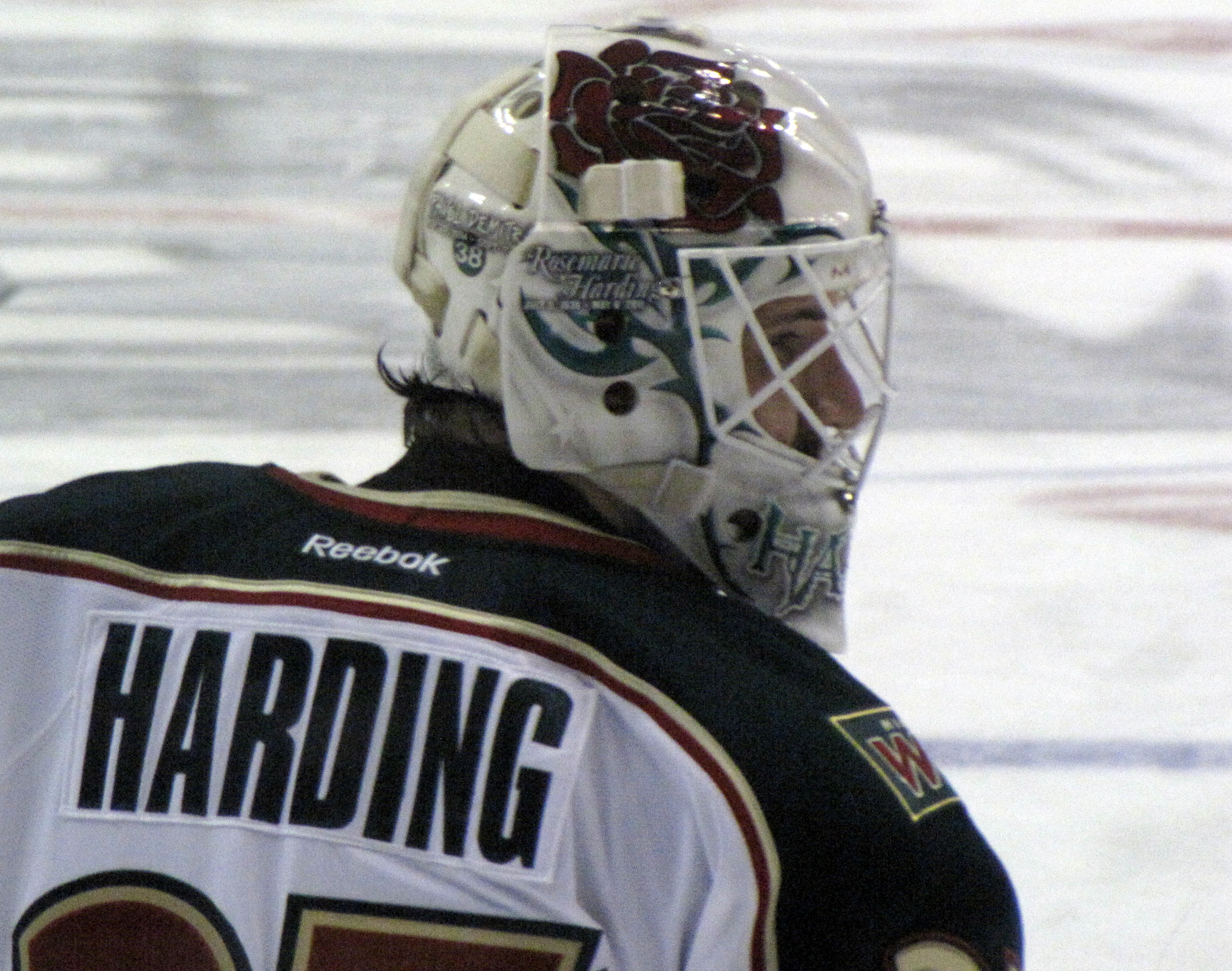
Josh Harding, Miller Alumni

- John Donnelly, bassist and vocalist of the Queen City Kids
- Christine Tell, politician
- Denise Batters, politician, Senator
- Josh Harding, NHL goaltender for the Minnesota Wild
- David Plummer, software engineer on MS-DOS and Microsoft Windows, author of Task Manager in Windows, Space Cadet pinball Windows NT port, etc.
- Brett Wade, CFL Defensive Tackle for the Hamilton Tiger-Cats

== Affiliated communities ==
- Al Ritchie
- Arcola East - North
- Arcola East - South
- Boothill
- Cathedral
- Core Group
- Gladmer Park
- Glencairn
- Glenelm
- Parkridge
