= Dr. Martin LeBoldus High School =

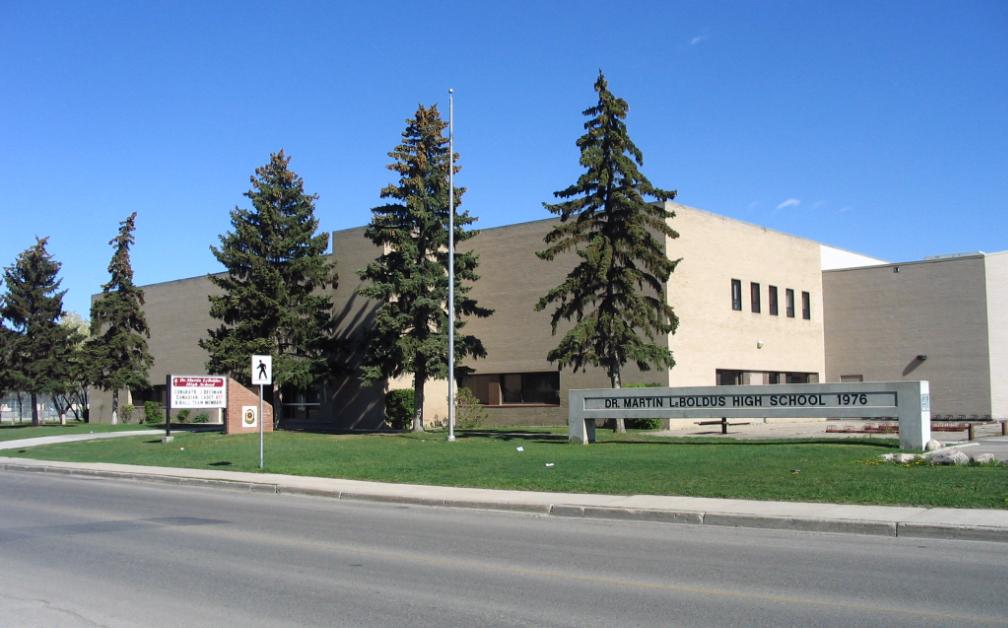

Location
- 2330 25th Avenue; Regina, Saskatchewan, S4S 4E6; Canada; 50.4195°N 104.61446°W

Information
- School type: High School
- Motto: Touch the Sun
- Religious affiliation: Roman Catholic
- Founded: 1976
- School board: Regina Catholic School Division
- Principal: Trevor Troy
- Grades: 9-12
- Enrollment: 950
- Language: English, French Immersion
- Area: Regina
- Colours: Maroon and gold
- Mascot: Sun Boy
- Team name: Golden Suns (a.k.a. Suns)
- Website: drmartinleboldus.rcsd.ca

Dr. Martin LeBoldus High School is a Catholic secondary school located in the Hillsdale neighbourhood of south Regina, Saskatchewan, Canada. It is a part of Regina Catholic Schools. Opened February 1, 1976, it replaced the nearby girls' and boys' separate schools. It was named after Martin LeBoldus, former provincial coroner and longtime trustee of the Regina Catholic school system. The school serves students from most of the neighbourhoods in the central, south and east communities of Regina. It also offers a dual track French immersion program.

There are 5 feeder schools: Deshaye Catholic School, St. Elizabeth School, St. Kateri Tekakwitha School, St. Matthew School, and St. Pius X School.

== Notable alumni ==
- Simon Bairu, long-distance runner
- Dan Comiskey, Canadian Football League player
- Tamon George, Canadian Football League player
- Mike Hasenfratz, National Hockey League referee
- Lynn Kanuka-Williams, track & field, Olympic bronze medalist
- Tatiana Maslany, Canadian actress
- Mark McMorris, professional snowboarder, Olympic bronze medalist
- D. T. H. van der Merwe, professional rugby union player
- Paul Woldu, Canadian Football League player
- Alexandra Wrubleski, road cyclist

== Affiliated communities ==
- Albert Park (pop. 11,450)
- Arcola East - North (pop. 9995)
- Arcola East - South (pop. 7665)
- Boothill (pop. 2765)
- Cathedral (pop. 7085)
- Core Area (pop. 4430)
- Gladmer Park (pop. 1470)
- Hillsdale (pop. 5795)
- Lakeview (pop. 7600)
- Whitmore Park (pop. 6425)
- Harbour Landing (pop. 14,000)
