= Michael A. Riffel High School =

Michael A. Riffel Catholic High School
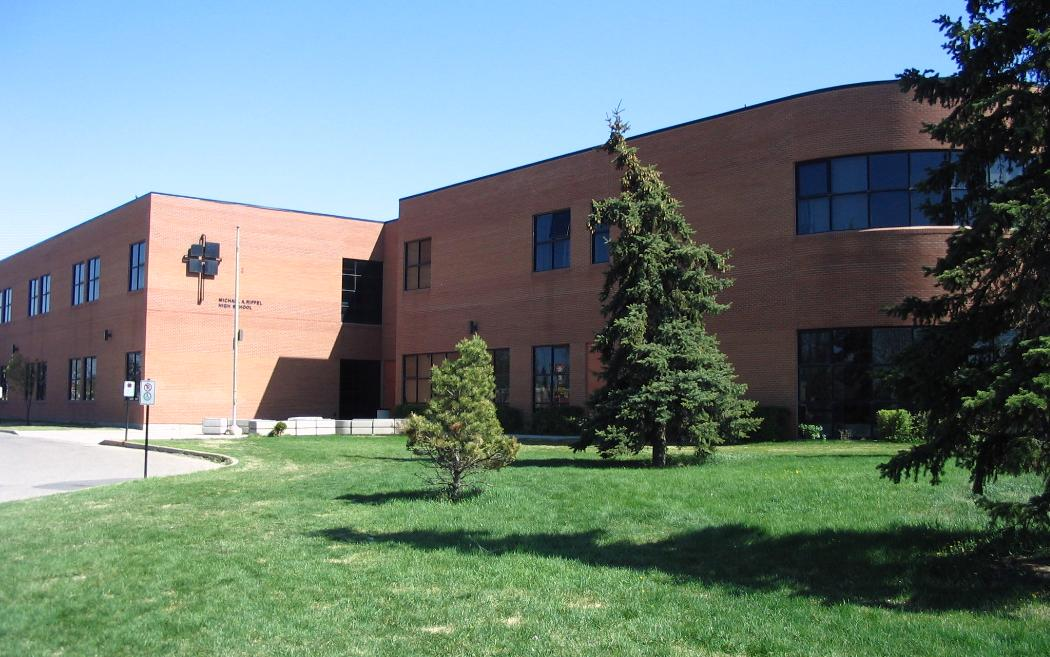

Location
- 5757 Rochdale Boulevard; Regina, Saskatchewan, S4X 3P5; Canada; 50.49503°N 104.66267°W

Information
- Type: High school
- Motto: Uphold the Cross, Capture the Crown
- Religious affiliation: Roman Catholic
- Established: 1985
- Founder: Michael A. Riffel
- School district: Regina Catholic School Division
- Principal: Roman Brown
- Grades: 9–12
- Gender: Male, Female
- Age range: 13-18
- Colours: Red, Blue, White
- Team name: Royals
- Website: www.rcsd.ca/riffel

Michael A. Riffel Catholic High School is a Catholic high school in Regina, Saskatchewan, Canada. It was established in 1985 and is part of the Regina Catholic School Division.

It opened to cater to the city's then-rapidly growing northwest quadrant, and to alleviate the congestion at Archbishop M.C. O'Neill High School. It was named in honor of Mr. Michael A. Riffel, former trustee of the Regina Catholic School Division. The school originally opened with 145 students and has grown to over 800 students.

The school's athletics are known as the Royals and has four feeder elementary schools: St. Bernadette School, St. Jerome School, St. Josaphat School, and St. Nicholas School.

== Notable alumni ==
- Chris Kunitz, National Hockey League player
- Tanner Schmekel, Canadian Football League player
- Chandler Stephenson, National Hockey League player
