= 2003–04 NCAA Division I men's ice hockey season =

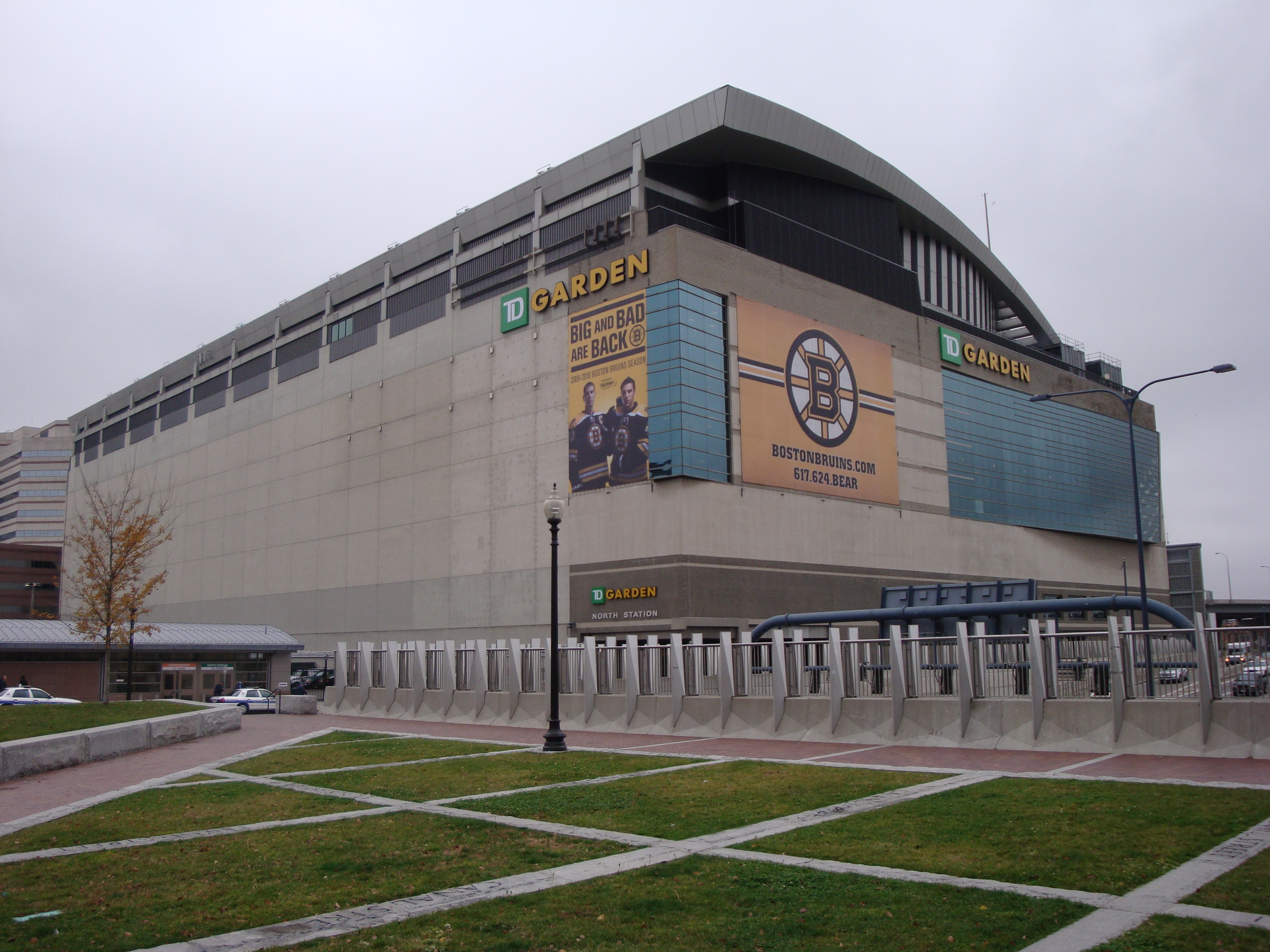
- The Fleet Center in Boston, Massachusetts hosted the 2004 Frozen Four
- Duration: October 3, 2003– April 10, 2004
- NCAA tournament: 2004
- National championship: Fleet Center; Boston, Massachusetts
- NCAA champion: Denver
- Hobey Baker Award: Junior Lessard (Minnesota-Duluth)

The 2003–04 NCAA Division I men's ice hockey season began on October 3, 2003 and concluded with the 2004 NCAA Division I men's ice hockey tournament's championship game on April 10, 2004 at the Fleet Center in Boston, Massachusetts. This was the 57th season in which an NCAA ice hockey championship was held and is the 110th year overall where an NCAA school fielded a team. The 2003-04 season was the inaugural year for the Atlantic Hockey Association after the discontinuation of Division I ice hockey sponsorship by the MAAC at the conclusion of the previous season.

== Season Outlook ==
=== Pre-season polls ===
The top teams in the nation as ranked before the start of the season.

The U.S. College Hockey Online poll was voted on by coaches, media, and NHL scouts. The USA Today/American Hockey Magazine poll was voted on by coaches and media.

USCHO Poll
Rank	Team
1	Minnesota (25)
2	Michigan (2)
3	Boston College (2)
4	New Hampshire (1)
5	North Dakota
6	Boston University
7	Harvard
8	Ferris State
9	Cornell
10	Michigan State
11	Colorado College
12	Maine
13	Denver
14	Ohio State
15	Minnesota-Duluth

USA Today Poll
Rank	Team
1	Minnesota (25)
2	Michigan (3)
3	Boston College (3)
4	New Hampshire
5	North Dakota (2)
6	Harvard
7	Boston University
8	Cornell (1)
9	Ferris State
10	Colorado College
11	Michigan State
12	Denver
13	Maine
14	Ohio State
15	Minnesota-Duluth

== Regular season ==
=== Season tournaments ===
Tournament	Dates	Teams	Champion
Lefty McFadden Invitational	October 3–4	4	Denver
Ice Breaker Tournament	October 10–11	4	Boston College
Maverick Stampede	October 10–11	4	Maine
Black Bear Classic	October 17–18	4	Maine
College Hockey Showcase	November 28–29	4	
Dodge Holiday Classic	December 20–21	4	Minnesota
Badger Showdown	December 27–28	4	Ferris State
Denver Cup	December 27–28	4	Denver
Dunkin' Donuts Coffee Pot	December 27–28	4	St. Cloud State
Florida College Classic	December 27–28	4	Cornell
Great Lakes Invitational	December 27–28	4	Boston College
Sheraton/Banknorth Hockey Classic	December 27–28	4	Dartmouth
Subway Holiday Classic	December 27–28	4	North Dakota
Rensselaer Holiday Tournament	December 28–29	4	Northeastern
Beanpot	February 2, 9	4	Boston College

=== Standings ===
2003–04 Atlantic Hockey standings
	Conference							Overall					
	GP	W	L	T	PTS	GF	GA	GP	W	L	T	GF	GA
Holy Cross†*	24	17	4	3	37	83	54	36	22	10	4	117	89
Mercyhurst	24	16	7	1	33	105	71	36	20	14	2	145	122
Quinnipiac	24	12	6	6	30	67	53	35	15	14	6	87	87
Sacred Heart	24	12	8	4	28	87	68	36	14	17	5	107	114
Connecticut	24	9	10	5	23	89	86	35	12	16	7	115	127
Canisius	24	9	11	4	22	67	73	34	10	16	8	84	107
Bentley	24	7	13	4	18	55	71	32	9	19	4	79	103
Army	24	6	15	3	15	55	84	33	12	18	3	82	107
American International	24	3	17	4	10	49	97	34	5	25	4	71	138
Championship: Holy Cross † indicates conference regular season champion * indicates conference tournament champion Final rankings: USA Today/American Hockey Magazine Poll Top 15 Poll

2003–04 Central Collegiate Hockey Association standings
	Conference							Overall					
	GP	W	L	T	PTS	GF	GA	GP	W	L	T	GF	GA
#7 Michigan†	28	18	8	2	38	101	66	43	27	14	2	151	104
#10 Miami	28	17	8	3	37	99	74	41	23	14	4	137	106
#14 Michigan State	28	17	9	2	36	91	62	42	23	17	2	136	105
#9 Ohio State*	28	16	12	0	32	89	70	42	26	16	0	134	106
#12 Notre Dame	28	14	11	3	31	84	71	39	20	15	4	108	99
Alaska-Fairbanks	28	14	13	1	29	92	92	36	16	19	1	117	127
Northern Michigan	28	13	13	2	28	66	79	41	21	16	4	105	113
Western Michigan	28	12	13	3	27	87	101	39	17	18	4	123	136
Bowling Green	28	9	13	6	24	69	83	38	11	18	9	92	112
Ferris State	28	10	17	1	21	71	97	38	15	20	3	108	126
Lake Superior State	28	7	16	5	19	60	83	36	9	20	7	72	102
Nebraska-Omaha	28	5	19	4	14	60	91	39	8	26	5	91	135
Championship: Ohio State † indicates conference regular season champion * indicates conference tournament champion Final rankings: USA Today/American Hockey Magazine Poll Top 15 Poll

2003–04 College Hockey America standings
	Conference							Overall					
	GP	W	L	T	PTS	GF	GA	GP	W	L	T	GF	GA
Bemidji State†	20	16	3	1	33	90	48	36	20	13	3	131	94
Niagara*	20	14	6	0	28	72	52	39	21	15	3	124	120
Alabama-Huntsville	20	10	9	1	21	65	60	31	11	16	4	92	94
Findlay	20	7	11	2	16	58	60	38	11	22	5	95	114
Air Force	20	6	13	1	13	49	78	37	14	21	2	101	131
Wayne State	20	4	15	1	9	44	80	36	9	24	3	83	144
Championship: Niagara † indicates conference regular season champion * indicates conference tournament champion Final rankings: USA Today/American Hockey Magazine Poll Top 15 Poll

2003–04 ECAC Hockey standings
	Conference							Overall					
	GP	W	L	T	PTS	GF	GA	GP	W	L	T	GF	GA
Colgate†	22	14	6	2	30	65	44	39	22	12	5	111	80
Cornell	22	13	6	3	29	53	32	32	16	10	6	85	62
Brown	22	13	7	2	28	62	40	31	15	11	5	80	60
Dartmouth	22	10	5	7	27	66	60	34	14	11	9	95	91
Rensselaer	22	13	8	1	27	70	44	39	22	15	2	116	89
#13 Harvard*	22	10	10	2	22	58	55	36	18	15	3	104	94
Yale	22	10	12	0	20	65	88	31	12	19	0	89	134
Union	22	8	11	3	19	46	52	36	14	17	5	89	108
Clarkson	22	8	12	2	18	51	61	41	18	18	5	121	113
St. Lawrence	22	7	12	3	17	62	67	41	14	21	6	104	119
Vermont	22	7	14	1	15	57	79	35	9	22	4	85	127
Princeton	22	5	15	2	12	50	83	31	5	24	2	62	122
Championship: Harvard † indicates conference regular season champion (Cleary Cup) * indicates conference tournament champion (Whitelaw Cup); Final rankings: USA Today/American Hockey Magazine Poll Top 15 Poll

2003–04 Hockey East standings
	Conference							Overall					
	GP	W	L	T	PTS	GF	GA	GP	W	L	T	GF	GA
#3 Boston College†	24	17	4	3	37	88	45	42	29	9	4	143	81
#2 Maine*	24	17	5	2	36	77	42	44	33	8	3	141	69
Massachusetts	24	12	9	3	27	47	63	37	17	14	6	93	99
#11 New Hampshire	24	10	8	6	26	82	76	41	20	15	6	138	116
Providence	24	7	11	6	20	63	66	37	16	14	7	106	92
Massachusetts–Lowell	24	7	12	5	19	56	65	40	15	18	7	105	116
Merrimack	24	6	12	6	18	53	79	36	11	19	6	86	110
Boston University	24	6	13	5	17	57	71	38	12	17	9	103	108
Northeastern	24	5	13	6	16	56	72	34	11	16	7	92	103
Championship: Maine † indicates conference regular season champion * indicates conference tournament champion Final rankings: USA Today/American Hockey Magazine Poll Top 15 Poll

2003–04 Western Collegiate Hockey Association standings
	Conference							Overall					
	GP	W	L	T	PTS	GF	GA	GP	W	L	T	GF	GA
#5 North Dakota†	28	20	5	3	43	122	62	41	30	8	3	182	90
#4 Minnesota–Duluth	28	19	7	2	40	119	71	45	28	13	4	185	123
#8 Wisconsin	28	14	7	7	35	85	62	43	22	13	8	123	93
#1 Denver	28	13	10	5	31	93	90	44	27	12	5	149	120
#6 Minnesota*	28	15	12	1	31	101	86	44	27	14	3	178	127
St. Cloud State	28	12	12	4	28	81	89	38	18	16	4	113	118
#15 Colorado College	28	11	15	2	24	77	75	39	20	16	3	126	98
Alaska–Anchorage	28	7	18	3	17	68	103	40	14	23	3	104	140
Minnesota State	28	6	18	4	16	83	139	39	10	24	5	124	179
Michigan Tech	28	6	19	3	15	66	118	38	8	25	5	97	161
Championship: Minnesota † indicates conference regular season champion * indicates conference tournament champion Final rankings: USA Today/American Hockey Magazine Poll Top 15 Poll

=== Final regular season polls ===
The top 15 teams ranked before the NCAA tournament.

USA Today Poll
Ranking	Team
1	Maine
2	North Dakota
3	Minnesota
4	Boston College
5	Minnesota-Duluth
6	Ohio State
7	Michigan
8	Denver
9	Miami
10	New Hampshire
11	Wisconsin
12	Michigan State
13	Notre Dame
14	Colorado College
15	Harvard

USCHO Poll
Ranking	Team
1	Maine
2	North Dakota
3	Minnesota
4	Boston College
5	Minnesota-Duluth
6	Ohio State
7	Michigan
8	Miami
9	Denver
10	New Hampshire
11	Wisconsin
12	Michigan State
13	Notre Dame
14	Massachusetts
15	Harvard

== 2004 NCAA tournament ==
Regional semifinals
1	Maine	5
4	Harvard	4
East Regional
2	Ohio State	0
3	Wisconsin	1*
1	Boston College	1*
4	Niagara	0
Northeast Regional
2	Michigan	3
3	New Hampshire	2
1	Minnesota	4*
4	Notre Dame	3
Midwest Regional
2	Minnesota-Duluth	3*
3	Michigan State	2
1	North Dakota	6
4	Holy Cross	5
West Regional
2	Denver	4
3	Miami	1

Regional Finals
1	Maine	2*
3	Wisconsin	1
1	Boston College	3*
2	Michigan	2
1	Minnesota	1
2	Minnesota-Duluth	3
1	North Dakota	0
2	Denver	1

Frozen Four
E1	Maine	2
NE1	Boston College	1
MW2	Minnesota-Duluth	3
W2	Denver	5

National Championship
E1	Maine	0
W2	Denver	1

Note: * denotes overtime period(s)

== Player stats ==
=== Scoring leaders ===
The following players led the league in points at the conclusion of the season.

GP = Games played; G = Goals; A = Assists; Pts = Points; PIM = Penalty minutes

Player	Class	Team	GP	G	A	Pts	PIM
Junior Lessard	Senior	Minnesota-Duluth	45	32	31	63	34
Brandon Bochenski	Junior	North Dakota	41	27	33	60	40
Evan Schwabe	Junior	Minnesota-Duluth	45	19	38	57	34
Zach Parise	Sophomore	North Dakota	37	23	32	55	24
Barret Ehgoetz	Junior	Niagara	39	25	27	52	24
Thomas Vanek	Sophomore	Minnesota	38	26	25	51	72
Jared Ross	Junior	Alabama-Huntsville	31	19	31	50	46
Steve Saviano	Senior	New Hampshire	41	27	22	49	2
Troy Riddle	Senior	Minnesota	44	24	25	49	52
Derek Edwardson	Senior	Miami	41	17	31	48	36
Jim Slater	Junior	Michigan State	42	19	29	48	38

=== Leading goaltenders ===
The following goaltenders led the league in goals against average at the end of the regular season while playing at least 33% of their team's total minutes.

GP = Games played; Min = Minutes played; W = Wins; L = Losses; OT = Overtime/shootout losses; GA = Goals against; SO = Shutouts; SV% = Save percentage; GAA = Goals against average

Player	Class	Team	GP	Min	W	L	OT	GA	SO	SV%	GAA
Jimmy Howard	Sophomore	Maine	22	1363	14	4	3	27	6	.956	1.19
Matti Kaltiainen	Junior	Boston College	38	2280	27	7	4	67	4	.907	1.76
Yann Danis	Senior	Brown	30	1820	15	11	4	55	5	.942	1.81
Frank Doyle	Senior	Maine	23	1323	19	4	0	40	5	.923	1.81
Steve Silverhorn	Junior	Colgate	31	1874	18	9	4	57	3	.927	1.82
David McKee	Freshman	Cornell	32	1929	16	10	6	59	5	.920	1.83
Jordan Parise	Freshman	North Dakota	22	1229	14	4	3	42	2	.908	2.05
Bernd Brückler	Junior	Wisconsin	38	2299	19	10	8	80	4	.924	2.09
Jeff Jakaitis	Freshman	Lake Superior State	23	1209	5	10	4	43	3	.933	2.13
Nathan Marsters	Senior	Rensselaer	35	2093	21	13	1	75	5	.922	2.15

== Awards ==
=== NCAA ===
Award		Recipient
Hobey Baker Memorial Award		Junior Lessard, Minnesota-Duluth
Spencer T. Penrose Award (Coach of the Year)		Scott Sandelin, Minnesota-Duluth
Most Outstanding Player in NCAA Tournament		Adam Berkhoel, Denver
AHCA All-American Teams
East First Team	Position	West First Team
Yann Danis, Brown	G	Bernd Brückler, Wisconsin
Andrew Alberts, Boston College	D	Keith Ballard, Minnesota
Thomas Pöck, Massachusetts	D	Ryan Caldwell, Denver
Steve Saviano, New Hampshire	F	Brandon Bochenski, North Dakota
Lee Stempniak, Dartmouth	F	Junior Lessard, Minnesota-Duluth
Tony Voce, Boston College	F	Zach Parise, North Dakota
East Second Team	Position	West Second Team
Jimmy Howard, Maine	G	Al Montoya, Michigan
Prestin Ryan, Maine	D	Beau Geisler, Minnesota-Duluth
Stephen Wood, Providence	D	A. J. Thelen, Michigan State
Patrick Eaves, Boston College	F	Derek Edwardson, Miami
Todd Jackson, Maine	F	Jim Slater, Michigan State
Ryan Shannon, Boston College	F	Thomas Vanek, Minnesota
Colin Shields, Maine	F	

=== Atlantic Hockey ===
Award		Recipient
Player of the Year		Tim Olsen, Connecticut
Best Defensive Forward		Greg Kealey, Holy Cross
Best Defenseman		T.J. Kemp, Mercyhurst
Rookie of the Year		Pierre-Luc O'Brien, Sacred Heart
Regular Season Goaltending Award		Jamie Holden, Quinnipiac
Coach of the Year		Paul Pearl, Holy Cross
Most Valuable Player in Tournament		Greg Kealey, Holy Cross
Individual Sportsmanship		Tim Coskren, Holy Cross
Regular Season Scoring Trophy		Tim Olsen, Connecticut
All-Atlantic Hockey Teams
First Team	Position	Second Team
Jamie Holden, Quinnipiac	G	Tony Quesada, Holy Cross
T. J. Kemp, Mercyhurst	D	Reid Cashman, Quinnipiac
Eric Nelson, Connecticut	D	Konn Hawkes, Sacred Heart
Jeff Dams, Holy Cross	F	Garrett Larson, Sacred Heart
Tim Olsen, Connecticut	F	Mike Carter, Mercyhurst
Guillaume Caron, American International	F	David Wrigley, Mercyhurst
Rookie Team	Position	
Scott Tomes, Connecticut	G	
Reid Cashman, Quinnipiac	D	
Jamie Hunt, Mercyhurst	D	
Pierre-Luc O'Brien, Sacred Heart	F	
Matt Scherer, Connecticut	F	
James Sixsmith, Holy Cross	F	

=== CCHA ===
Awards		Recipient
Player of the Year		Derek Edwardson, Miami
Best Defensive Forward		Dwight Helminen, Michigan
Best Defensive Defenseman		Doug Andress, Ohio State
Best Offensive Defenseman		A. J. Thelen, Michigan State
Rookie of the Year		T. J. Hensick, Michigan
Goaltender of the Year		Dominic Vicari, Michigan State
Coach of the Year		Enrico Blasi, Miami
Terry Flanagan Memorial Award		Aaron Voros, Alaska-Fairbanks
Ilitch Humanitarian Award		Neil Komadoski, Notre Dame
Perani Cup Champion		Craig Kowalski, Northern Michigan
Most Valuable Player in Tournament		Paul Caponigri, Ohio State
All-CCHA Teams
First Team	Position	Second Team
Jordan Sigalet, Bowling Green	G	Al Montoya, Michigan
Andy Greene, Miami	D	Brett Lebda, Notre Dame
A. J. Thelen, Michigan State	D	Nathan Oystrick, Northern Michigan
	D	Brandon Rogers, Michigan
Derek Edwardson, Miami	F	Aaron Gill, Notre Dame
T. J. Hensick, Michigan	F	Rob Globke, Notre Dame
Jim Slater, Michigan State	F	Greg Hogeboom, Miami
Rookie Team	Position	
Dominic Vicari, Michigan State	G	
Matt Hunwick, Michigan	D	
A.J. Thelen, Michigan State	D	
Matt Christie, Miami	F	
Marty Guerin, Miami	F	
T.J. Hensick, Michigan	F	

=== CHA ===
Award		Recipient
Player of the Year		Barret Ehgoetz, Niagara
		Jared Ross, Alabama-Huntsville
Rookie of the Year		Luke Erickson, Bemidji State
Coach of the Year		Tom Serratore, Bemidji State
Student-Athlete of the Year		Mike Polidor, Air Force
Most Valuable Player in Tournament		Jeff Van Nynatten, Niagara
All-CHA Teams
First Team	Position	Second Team
Jeff Van Nynatten, Niagara	G	Grady Hunt, Bemidji State
Jeremy Schreiber, Alabama-Huntsville	D	Andrew Lackner, Niagara
Bryce Methven, Bemidji State	D	Peter Jonsson, Bemidji State
Jared Ross, Alabama-Huntsville	F	Kris Wiebe, Findlay
Barret Ehgoetz, Niagara	F	Joe Tallari, Niagara
Brenden Cook, Bemidji State	F	Riley Riddell, Bemidji State
Rookie Team	Position	
Will Hooper, Findlay	G	
Kenny Macaulay, Findlay	D	
Pat Oliveto, Niagara	D	
Mike Batovanja, Findlay	F	
Luke Erickson, Bemidji State	F	
Nate Higgins, Wayne State	F	

=== ECAC ===
Award		Recipient
Player of the Year		Yann Danis, Brown
Rookie of the Year		David McKee, Cornell
		Brian Ihnacak, Brown
Coach of the Year		Stan Moore, Colgate
Best Defensive Forward		Jon Smyth, Colgate
Best Defensive Defenseman		Scott Ford, Brown
Ken Dryden Award		Yann Danis, Brown
Most Outstanding Player in Tournament		Brendan Bernakevitch, Harvard
All-ECAC Hockey Teams
First Team	Position	Second Team
Yann Danis, Brown	G	Nathan Marsters, Rensselaer
Grant Lewis, Dartmouth	D	Scott Basiuk, Rensselaer
Ryan Glenn, St. Lawrence	D	Rob Brown, Colgate
Brady Leisenring, Vermont	F	Joe Zappala, Yale
Lee Stempniak, Dartmouth	F	Hugh Jessiman, Dartmouth
Jon Smyth, Colgate	F	Kevin Croxton, Rensselaer
Rookie Team	Position	
David McKee, Cornell	G	
Grant Lewis, Dartmouth	D	
Mike Campaner, Colgate	D	
Brian Ihnacak, Brown	F	
Kyle Rank, St. Lawrence	F	
Oren Eizenman, Rensselaer	F	

=== Hockey East ===
Award		Recipient
Player of the Year		Steve Saviano, New Hampshire
Rookie of the Year		Michel Léveillé, Maine
Bob Kullen Coach of the Year Award		Jerry York, Boston College
Len Ceglarski Sportsmanship Award		Steve Saviano, New Hampshire
Best Defensive Forward		Todd Jackson, Maine
Best Defensive Defenseman		Andrew Alberts, Boston College
		Prestin Ryan, Maine
Three-Stars Award		Keni Gibson, Northeastern
William Flynn Tournament Most Valuable Player		Jimmy Howard, Maine
All-Hockey East Teams
First Team	Position	Second Team
Jimmy Howard, Maine	G	Matti Kaltiainen, Boston College
Thomas Pöck, Massachusetts	D	Andrew Alberts, Boston College
Stephen Wood, Providence	D	Prestin Ryan, Maine
Steve Saviano, New Hampshire	F	Patrick Eaves, Boston College
Ryan Shannon, Boston College	F	Todd Jackson, Maine
Tony Voce, Boston College	F	Colin Shields, Maine
Rookie Team	Position	
Jim Healey, Merrimack	G	
Cleve Kinley, Massachusetts-Lowell	D	
Kevin Schaeffer, Boston University	D	
Brett Hemingway, New Hampshire	F	
Michel Léveillé, Maine	F	
Colin McDonald, Providence	F	
Jason Tejchma, Massachusetts-Lowell	F	

=== WCHA ===
Award		Recipient
Player of the Year		Junior Lessard, Minnesota-Duluth
Defensive Player of the Year		Ryan Caldwell, Denver
Rookie of the Year		Brady Murray, North Dakota
Student-Athlete of the Year		Connor James, Denver
Coach of the Year		Scott Sandelin, Minnesota-Duluth
Most Valuable Player in Tournament		Kellen Briggs, Minnesota
All-WCHA Teams
First Team	Position	Second Team
Bernd Brückler, Wisconsin	G	Isaac Reichmuth, Minnesota-Duluth
Keith Ballard, Minnesota	D	Ryan Caldwell, Denver
Beau Geisler, Minnesota-Duluth	D	Matt Jones, North Dakota
Junior Lessard, Minnesota-Duluth	F	Chris Conner, Michigan Tech
Brandon Bochenski, North Dakota	F	Thomas Vanek, Minnesota
Zach Parise, North Dakota	F	Evan Schwabe, Minnesota-Duluth
Third Team	Position	Rookie Team
Adam Berkhoel, Denver	G	Matt Zaba, Colorado College
Mark Stuart, Colorado College	D	Ryan Suter, Wisconsin
Ryan Suter, Wisconsin	D	Matt Carle, Denver
Shane Joseph, Minnesota State	F	Brady Murray, North Dakota
Brady Murray, North Dakota	F	David Backes, Minnesota State
Gabe Gauthier, Denver	F	Robbie Earl, Wisconsin

== 2004 NHL entry draft ==
Round	Pick	Player	College	Conference	NHL team
1	5	Blake Wheeler ^{†}	Minnesota	WCHA	Phoenix Coyotes
1	6	Al Montoya	Michigan	CCHA	New York Rangers
1	12	A. J. Thelen	Michigan State	CCHA	Minnesota Wild
1	13	Drew Stafford	North Dakota	WCHA	Buffalo Sabres
1	20	Travis Zajac ^{†}	North Dakota	WCHA	New Jersey Devils
1	24	Kris Chucko ^{†}	Minnesota	WCHA	Calgary Flames
1	26	Cory Schneider ^{†}	Boston College	Hockey East	Vancouver Canucks
2	33	Chris Bourque ^{†}	Boston University	Hockey East	Washington Capitals
2	36	Darin Olver	Northern Michigan	WCHA	New York Rangers
2	40	Grant Lewis	Dartmouth	ECAC Hockey	Atlanta Thrashers
2	52	Raymond Sawada ^{†}	Cornell	ECAC Hockey	Dallas Stars
2	53	David Booth	Michigan State	CCHA	Florida Panthers
2	55	Victor Oreskovich ^{†}	Notre Dame	CCHA	Colorado Avalanche
2	57	Geoff Paukovich ^{†}	Denver	WCHA	Edmonton Oilers
2	61	Alex Goligoski ^{†}	Minnesota	WCHA	Pittsburgh Penguins
3	67	Nick Johnson ^{†}	Dartmouth	ECAC Hockey	Pittsburgh Penguins
3	69	Casey Borer	St. Cloud State	WCHA	Carolina Hurricanes
3	74	Kyle Klubertanz ^{†}	Wisconsin	WCHA	Mighty Ducks of Anaheim
3	77	Shawn Weller ^{†}	Clarkson	ECAC Hockey	Ottawa Senators
3	80	Billy Ryan ^{†}	Maine	Hockey East	New York Rangers
3	85	Brian Gifford ^{†}	Denver	WCHA	San Jose Sharks
3	92	Rob Bellamy ^{†}	Maine	Hockey East	Philadelphia Flyers
3	95	Paul Baier ^{†}	Brown	ECAC Hockey	Los Angeles Kings
4	100	J. T. Wyman ^{†}	Dartmouth	ECAC Hockey	Montreal Canadiens
4	101	R. J. Anderson ^{†}	Minnesota	WCHA	Philadelphia Flyers
4	102	Mike Lundin	Maine	Hockey East	Tampa Bay Lightning
4	111	Ryan Jones ^{†}	Miami	CCHA	Minnesota Wild
4	115	Wes O'Neill	Notre Dame	CCHA	New York Islanders
4	119	Kevin Porter ^{†}	Michigan	CCHA	Phoenix Coyotes
4	125	Andrew Sarauer ^{†}	Northern Michigan	WCHA	Vancouver Canucks
4	126	Torrey Mitchell ^{†}	Vermont	ECAC Hockey	San Jose Sharks
5	140	Jake Dowell	Wisconsin	WCHA	Chicago Blackhawks
5	141	Jim McKenzie ^{†}	Michigan State	CCHA	Ottawa Senators
5	144	Chris Zarb ^{†}	Ferris State	CCHA	Philadelphia Flyers
5	153	Steven Zalewski ^{†}	Clarkson	ECAC Hockey	San Jose Sharks
5	159	Mike Brown	Michigan	CCHA	Vancouver Canucks
5	160	Ben Walter	Massachusetts–Lowell	Hockey East	Boston Bruins
5	163	Dusty Collins	Northern Michigan	WCHA	Tampa Bay Lightning
6	165	Scott McCulloch	Colorado College	WCHA	Chicago Blackhawks
6	167	Robert Page ^{†}	Yale	ECAC Hockey	Columbus Blue Jackets
6	169	Jordan Foote ^{†}	Michigan Tech	WCHA	New York Rangers
6	172	Matt Auffrey ^{†}	Wisconsin	WCHA	Mighty Ducks of Anaheim
6	174	Scott Parse	Nebraska–Omaha	CCHA	Los Angeles Kings
6	178	Mike Santorelli ^{†}	Northern Michigan	WCHA	Nashville Predators
6	183	Trevor Ludwig ^{†}	Providence	Hockey East	Dallas Stars
6	184	Derek Peltier ^{†}	Minnesota	WCHA	Colorado Avalanche
6	187	Robbie Earl	Wisconsin	WCHA	Toronto Maple Leafs
6	193	Kevin Schaeffer	Boston University	Hockey East	Nashville Predators
7	194	Chris Peluso ^{†}	Bemidji State	CHA	Pittsburgh Penguins
7	197	Andrew Gordon ^{†}	St. Cloud State	WCHA	Washington Capitals
7	199	Chad Kolarik ^{†}	Michigan	CCHA	Phoenix Coyotes
7	205	Mike Curry ^{†}	Minnesota–Duluth	WCHA	Los Angeles Kings
7	212	Jon Gleed	Cornell	ECAC Hockey	Montreal Canadiens
7	213	Jimmy Spratt ^{†}	Bowling Green	CCHA	Calgary Flames
7	215	Ian Keserich ^{†}	Ohio State	CCHA	Colorado Avalanche
7	217	Tyler Eckford ^{†}	Alaska–Fairbanks	CCHA	New Jersey Devils
7	219	Joe Cooper	Miami	CCHA	Ottawa Senators
7	224	Matt Hunwick	Michigan	CCHA	Boston Bruins
7	225	David MacDonald ^{†}	Harvard	ECAC Hockey	San Jose Sharks
8	228	David Brown	Notre Dame	CCHA	Pittsburgh Penguins
8	230	Justin Mrazek ^{†}	Union	ECAC Hockey	Washington Capitals
8	231	Brian McGuirk ^{†}	Boston University	Hockey East	Columbus Blue Jackets
8	233	Matt Greer ^{†}	Minnesota–Duluth	WCHA	Columbus Blue Jackets
8	234	Derek MacIntyre ^{†}	Ferris State	CCHA	San Jose Sharks
8	236	Matt Christie	Miami	CCHA	Mighty Ducks of Anaheim
8	237	Mitch Carefoot	Cornell	ECAC Hockey	Atlanta Thrashers
8	239	Brandon Yip ^{†}	Boston University	Hockey East	Colorado Avalanche
8	249	J. D. Corbin	Denver	WCHA	Colorado Avalanche
8	250	Nathan Perkovich ^{†}	Lake Superior State	CCHA	New Jersey Devils
8	251	Matt McIlvane ^{†}	Ohio State	CCHA	Ottawa Senators
8	253	Travis Gawryletz ^{†}	Minnesota–Duluth	WCHA	Philadelphia Flyers
8	256	Matthew Ford ^{†}	Wisconsin	WCHA	Chicago Blackhawks
9	259	Brian Ihnačák	Brown	ECAC Hockey	Pittsburgh Penguins
9	261	Will Engasser ^{†}	Yale	ECAC Hockey	Phoenix Coyotes
9	263	Travis Morin	Minnesota State	WCHA	Washington Capitals
9	265	Daniel Winnik	New Hampshire	Hockey East	Phoenix Coyotes
9	267	Spencer Dillon ^{†}	Northern Michigan	WCHA	Florida Panthers
9	270	Matt Siddall ^{†}	Northern Michigan	WCHA	Atlanta Thrashers
9	271	Grant Clitsome ^{†}	Clarkson	ECAC Hockey	Columbus Blue Jackets
9	272	Kyle Wilson	Colgate	ECAC Hockey	Minnesota Wild
9	275	Craig Switzer ^{†}	New Hampshire	Hockey East	Nashville Predators
9	280	Matt McKnight ^{†}	Minnesota–Duluth	WCHA	Dallas Stars
9	283	Luke Beaverson ^{†}	Alaska–Anchorage	WCHA	Florida Panthers
9	285	Pierce Norton ^{†}	Providence	Hockey East	Toronto Maple Leafs
9	288	Brian Mahoney-Wilson ^{†}	Lake Superior State	CCHA	San Jose Sharks
9	289	Christian Jensen ^{†}	Rensselaer	ECAC Hockey	San Jose Sharks
9	290	Nils Backstrom ^{†}	Alaska–Anchorage	WCHA	Detroit Red Wings

† incoming freshman

== See also ==
- 2003–04 NCAA Division III men's ice hockey season
