= 2003–04 NCAA Division I men's ice hockey rankings =

- NCAA tournament: 2004
- NCAA champion: Denver
- Preseason No. 1 (USA Today): Minnesota
- Preseason No. 1 (USCHO): Minnesota
- NCAA Division I men's ice hockey rankings

Two human polls made up the 2003–04 NCAA Division I men's ice hockey rankings, the USCHO.com Division I Men's Poll and the USA TODAY/American Hockey Magazine Poll. As the 2003–04 season progressed, rankings were updated weekly. There were a total of 34 voters in the USA Today poll and 30 voters in the USCHO.com preseason poll with 40 voters in the rest of the polls. Each first place vote in either poll is worth 15 points in the rankings with every subsequent vote worth 1 fewer point.

== Legend ==
	Increase in ranking
	Decrease in ranking
	Not ranked previous week
(Italics)	Number of first place votes
#–#–#	Win–loss–tie record
†	Tied with team above or below also with this symbol

== USA TODAY/American Hockey Magazine Poll ==
	Preseason Sep 29	Week 1 Oct 6	Week 2 Oct 13	Week 3 Oct 20	Week 4 Oct 27	Week 5 Nov 3	Week 6 Nov 10	Week 7 Nov 17	Week 8 Nov 24	Week 9 Dec 1	Week 10 Dec 8	Week 11 Dec 15	Week 12 Dec 22	Week 13 Dec 29	Week 14 Jan 5	Week 15 Jan 12	Week 16 Jan 19	Week 17 Jan 26	Week 18 Feb 2	Week 19 Feb 9	Week 20 Feb 16	Week 21 Feb 23	Week 22 Mar 1	Week 23 Mar 8	Week 24 Mar 15	Week 25 Mar 22	Week 26 Mar 29	Final Apr 12	
1	Minnesota (25)	Minnesota (30) 0–0–0	Boston College (26) 2–0–1	Boston College (15) 3–1–1	Maine (20) 5–0–0	Maine (23) 7–0–0	North Dakota (28) 6–1–0	North Dakota (17) 7–2–0	North Dakota (33) 9–2–0	North Dakota (32) 9–2–0	North Dakota (31) 9–2–0	North Dakota (31) 11–2–0	North Dakota (31) 11–2–0	North Dakota (27) 13–2–0	North Dakota (33) 14–2–1	North Dakota (33) 15–2–2	North Dakota (33) 17–2–2	North Dakota (24) 18–3–2	North Dakota (23) 19–3–3	Boston College (30) 20–3–4	Boston College (34) 23–3–4	Boston College (34) 25–3–4	North Dakota (18) 24–6–3	North Dakota (34) 26–6–3	North Dakota (34) 28–6–3	Maine (21) 30–7–3	Maine (29) 32–7–3	Denver (34) 27–12–5	1
2	Michigan (3)	Michigan (1) 1–0–0	New Hampshire (3) 1–0–0	New Hampshire (11) 2–0–0	North Dakota (12) 2–1–0	North Dakota (11) 4–1–0	New Hampshire (5) 6–1–0	Boston College (12) 6–2–2	Boston College; 7–2–3	Boston College (2) 9–2–3	Boston College (3) 10–2–3	Boston College (3) 11–2–3	Boston College (3) 11–2–3	Boston College (7) 13–2–3	Boston College (1) 13–3–3	Boston College (1) 14–3–3	Boston College (1) 16–3–3	Boston College (10) 18–3–3	Boston College (11) 19–3–3	North Dakota (4) 19–5–3	North Dakota; 20–6–3	North Dakota; 22–6–3	Boston College (16) 26–4–4	Maine; 26–7–3	Maine; 28–7–3	North Dakota (13) 29–7–3	Boston College (4) 29–8–4	Maine; 33–8–3	2
3	Boston College (3)	Boston College (3) 1–0–0	North Dakota (3) 1–0–0	North Dakota (3) 2–1–0	Michigan (1) 6–1–0	New Hampshire; 4–1–0	Boston College; 5–2–1	Maine (3) 9–2–0	New Hampshire; 8–2–1	Maine; 10–2–1	Maine; 11–2–1	Maine; 12–2–1	Maine; 12–2–1	Wisconsin; 12–4–4	Wisconsin; 13–4–5	Maine; 15–4–1	Maine; 16–5–1	Michigan; 16–7–1	Maine; 19–6–1	Maine; 20–6–2	Michigan; 21–8–1	Maine; 23–6–3	Maine; 24–7–3	Boston College; 26–6–4	Minnesota-Duluth; 25–11–4	Minnesota; 26–13–3	Minnesota-Duluth (1) 28–12–4	Boston College; 29–9–4	3
4	New Hampshire	New Hampshire; 0–0–0	Minnesota; 1–1–0	Minnesota (3) 1–1–0	New Hampshire; 3–1–0	Michigan; 7–1–0	Maine; 7–2–0	New Hampshire; 6–2–1	Maine; 10–2–0	Colorado College; 8–1–3	Colorado College; 9–2–3	Wisconsin; 11–3–4	Wisconsin; 11–3–4	Colorado College; 9–4–3	Maine; 13–4–1	Wisconsin; 14–5–5	Michigan; 14–7–1	Maine; 17–6–1	Michigan; 18–7–1	Minnesota; 18–9–3	Maine; 21–6–3	Michigan; 23–8–1	Wisconsin; 20–9–7	Minnesota-Duluth; 23–10–4	Boston College; 27–8–4	Boston College; 27–8–4	Denver; 25–12–5	Minnesota-Duluth; 28–13–4	4
5	North Dakota (2)	North Dakota; 1–0–0	Maine (2) 2–0–0	Maine (2) 3–0–0	Boston College; 3–2–1	Boston College; 3–2–1	Michigan; 8–2–0	St. Cloud State (2) 8–1–1	Michigan; 9–3–0	New Hampshire; 9–3–1	New Hampshire; 10–4–1	Denver; 11–5–2	Colorado College; 9–4–3	Maine; 12–4–1	Colorado College; 11–4–3	Michigan; 14–7–1	Minnesota; 13–8–3	Minnesota; 14–9–3	Minnesota; 16–9–3	Michigan; 19–8–1	Minnesota-Duluth; 20–8–3	Minnesota-Duluth; 22–8–3	Minnesota-Duluth; 22–10–3	Wisconsin; 20–10–8	Minnesota; 24–13–3	Minnesota-Duluth; 26–12–4	North Dakota; 30–8–3	North Dakota; 30–8–3	5
6	Harvard	Harvard; 0–0–0	Boston University; 1–0–0	Michigan; 4–1–0	Denver (1) 4–0–0	Colorado College; 5–0–1	Colorado College; 6–1–1	Colorado College; 6–1–1	Colorado College; 6–1–3	St. Cloud State; 9–3–2	St. Cloud State; 10–4–2	Michigan; 11–6–1	Michigan; 11–6–1	Denver; 13–6–3	Denver; 15–6–3	St. Cloud State; 12–7–3	Wisconsin; 14–6–6	New Hampshire; 15–7–3	Minnesota-Duluth; 17–8–2	Minnesota-Duluth; 18–8–3	Wisconsin; 17–9–6	Wisconsin; 18–9–7	Michigan; 23–10–1	Denver; 23–10–5	Michigan; 25–12–2	Ohio State; 26–15–0	Michigan; 27–14–2	Minnesota; 27–14–3	6
7	Boston University	Boston University; 0–0–0	Michigan; 2–1–0	Boston University; 1–0–1	Boston University; 2–0–1	Denver; 5–1–0	St. Cloud State; 7–0–1	Michigan; 9–3–0	Massachusetts; 8–2–1	Ohio State; 11–5–0	Wisconsin; 9–3–4	Colorado College; 9–4–3	New Hampshire; 11–6–2	New Hampshire; 11–6–2	St. Cloud State; 12–7–3	Denver; 15–8–3	St. Cloud State; 13–8–3	Wisconsin; 15–7–6	Miami; 16–9–3	Wisconsin; 17–9–6	Minnesota; 18–11–3	Minnesota; 20–11–3	Denver; 21–10–5	Michigan; 23–11–2	Miami; 22–12–4	Michigan; 26–13–2	Minnesota; 27–14–3	Michigan; 27–14–2	7
8	Cornell (1)	Ferris State; 0–0–0	Harvard; 0–0–0	Denver; 4–0–0	Colorado College; 3–0–1	Boston University; 2–1–1	Denver; 6–2–0	Denver; 7–2–1	Ohio State; 10–5–0	Denver; 9–4–1	Massachusetts; 9–3–2	New Hampshire; 10–5–2	Denver; 11–6–3	St. Cloud State; 12–6–2	Michigan; 12–7–1	Minnesota; 11–8–3	New Hampshire; 14–7–3	Minnesota-Duluth; 17–8–2	St. Cloud State; 14–9–3	Miami; 18–9–3	St. Cloud State; 18–9–3	New Hampshire; 17–10–5	New Hampshire; 18–11–5	Minnesota; 22–13–3	New Hampshire; 20–13–6	Miami; 23–13–4	Wisconsin; 22–13–8	Wisconsin; 22–13–8	8
9	Ferris State	Cornell; 0–0–0	Cornell; 0–0–0	Colorado College; 2–0–0	Harvard; 0–0–0	Minnesota-Duluth; 4–2–1	Massachusetts; 7–1–0	Massachusetts; 8–2–0	St. Cloud State; 8–3–1	Michigan; 9–5–0	Michigan; 10–6–0	Massachusetts; 9–4–3	Massachusetts; 9–4–3	Michigan; 12–7–1	Cornell; 6–2–5	New Hampshire; 12–7–3	Minnesota-Duluth; 15–8–2	St. Cloud State; 14–9–3	Wisconsin; 15–9–6	St. Cloud State; 16–9–3	Miami; 18–11–3	St. Cloud State; 18–10–4	Miami; 19–11–4	Miami; 20–12–4	Denver; 23–12–5	Denver; 23–12–5	Ohio State; 26–16–0	Ohio State; 26–16–0	9
10	Colorado College	Denver; 2–0–0	Denver; 2–0–0	Harvard; 0–0–0	Minnesota-Duluth; 2–2–1	Minnesota; 2–4–0	Boston University; 2–2–1	Boston University; 3–2–2	Denver; 7–4–1	Massachusetts; 9–3–2	Denver; 9–5–2	St. Cloud State; 10–6–2	St. Cloud State; 10–6–2	Cornell; 6–2–5	Ohio State; 12–8–0	Colorado College; 11–6–3	Denver; 15–8–3	Denver; 16–9–3	New Hampshire; 15–9–3	Brown; 14–5–4	Denver; 18–10–4	Miami; 18–11–3	Minnesota; 20–13–3	New Hampshire; 18–12–6	Michigan State; 23–15–2	New Hampshire; 20–14–6	New Hampshire; 20–15–6	Miami; 23–14–4	10
11	Michigan State	Colorado College; 0–0–0	Colorado College; 0–0–0	Cornell; 0–0–0	Cornell; 0–0–0	St. Cloud State; 5–0–1	Cornell; 2–1–1	Cornell; 3–1–2	Dartmouth; 4–0–3	Wisconsin; 8–3–3	Ohio State; 11–7–0	Ohio State; 11–7–0	Ohio State; 11–7–0	Massachusetts; 9–4–5	New Hampshire; 11–7–2	Cornell; 7–3–5	Ohio State; 15–10–0	Miami; 14–9–3	Denver; 16–10–4	New Hampshire; 16–10–3	New Hampshire; 16–10–5	Denver; 19–10–5	Ohio State; 20–14–0	Michigan State; 21–15–2	Wisconsin †; 21–12–8	Wisconsin; 21–12–8	Miami; 23–14–4	New Hampshire; 20–15–6	11
12	Denver	Michigan State; 0–0–0	Ferris State; 1–1–0	Ohio State; 4–2–0	Minnesota; 1–3–0	Massachusetts; 5–1–0	Harvard; 1–1–1	Ohio State; 8–5–0	Boston University; 3–3–3	Brown; 6–1–1	Dartmouth; 4–1–4	Brown; 6–2–2	Brown; 6–2–2	Ohio State; 12–8–0	Dartmouth; 6–2–5	Minnesota-Duluth; 13–8–2	Colorado College; 11–8–3	Colorado College; 12–9–3	Massachusetts; 13–7–5	Denver; 16–10–4	Ohio State; 19–13–0	Ohio State; 20–14–0	Colgate; 19–10–5	Ohio State; 21–15–0	Ohio State †; 23–15–0	Michigan State; 23–16–2	Notre Dame; 20–15–4	Notre Dame; 20–15–4	12
13	Maine	Maine; 0–0–0	Minnesota-Duluth; 0–2–1	Providence; 4–0–0	Massachusetts; 4–0–0	Ohio State; 6–3–0	Ohio State; 7–4–0	Harvard; 2–2–1	Cornell; 3–2–3	Dartmouth; 4–1–4	Brown; 6–2–2	Dartmouth; 4–2–4	Dartmouth; 4–2–4	Dartmouth; 5–2–5	Minnesota; 9–8–3	Ohio State; 13–10–0	Cornell; 7–4–6	Cornell; 8–5–6	Brown; 12–5–4	Massachusetts; 14–8–5	Colorado College; 16–11–3	Colgate; 18–9–5	St. Cloud State; 18–12–4	Colgate; 19–10–5	Notre Dame; 20–13–4	Notre Dame; 20–14–4	Michigan State; 23–17–2	Harvard; 18–15–3	13
14	Ohio State	Minnesota-Duluth; 0–1–0	Michigan State; 1–1–0	Ferris State; 2–2–0	Providence; 4–1–1	Harvard; 0–1–0	Minnesota-Duluth; 4–4–1	Michigan State; 7–4–1	Brown; 4–1–0	Notre Dame; 8–3–2	Miami; 10–6–2	Miami; 10–6–2	Cornell; 4–2–5	Miami; 11–7–2	Miami; 11–7–2	Brown; 9–4–3	Massachusetts; 11–7–5	Michigan State; 15–11–1	Ohio State; 16–12–0	Colgate; 15–8–5	Brown; 14–6–5	Michigan State; 20–15–1	Michigan State; 20–15–1	Notre Dame; 18–12–4	Colorado College; 20–15–3	Massachusetts; 19–12–6	Harvard; 18–15–3	Michigan State; 23–17–2	14
15	Minnesota-Duluth	Ohio State; 1–1–0	Northern Michigan; 2–0–0	Massachusetts; 3–0–0	St. Cloud State; 3–0–1	Providence; 5–2–1	Michigan State; 6–3–1	Minnesota-Duluth; 5–5–1	Harvard; 2–2–1	Boston University; 4–4–4	Cornell; 4–2–5	Cornell; 4–2–5	Miami; 11–7–2	Minnesota; 9–8–1	Massachusetts; 9–6–5	Dartmouth; 6–3–5	Miami; 13–9–2	Brown; 11–5–4	Colgate; 15–8–3	Ohio State; 17–13–0	Massachusetts; 16–8–5	Massachusetts; 16–9–6	Colorado College †; 18–13–3	St. Cloud State; 18–14–4	Colgate; 21–11–5	Harvard; 18–14–3	Massachusetts; 19–12–6	Colorado College; 20–16–3	15
16																							Notre Dame †; 17–11–4						16
	Preseason Sep 29	Week 1 Oct 6	Week 2 Oct 13	Week 3 Oct 20	Week 4 Oct 27	Week 5 Nov 3	Week 6 Nov 10	Week 7 Nov 17	Week 8 Nov 24	Week 9 Dec 1	Week 10 Dec 8	Week 11 Dec 15	Week 12 Dec 22	Week 13 Dec 29	Week 14 Jan 5	Week 15 Jan 12	Week 16 Jan 19	Week 17 Jan 26	Week 18 Feb 2	Week 19 Feb 9	Week 20 Feb 16	Week 21 Feb 23	Week 22 Mar 1	Week 23 Mar 8	Week 24 Mar 15	Week 25 Mar 22	Week 26 Mar 29	Final Apr 12	
		Dropped: None	Dropped: Ohio State; 2–2–0	Dropped: Minnesota-Duluth; 0–2–1; Michigan State; 1–3–0; Northern Michigan; 3–1–0	Dropped: Ohio State; 4–3–0; Ferris State; 2–4–0	Dropped: Cornell; 0–1–1	Dropped: Minnesota; 2–6–0; Providence; 5–2–2	Dropped: None	Dropped: Michigan State; 8–5–1; Minnesota-Duluth; 6–5–2	Dropped: Cornell; 3–2–4; Harvard; 3–3–1	Dropped: Notre Dame; 8–5–2; Boston University; 4–5–4	Dropped: None	Dropped: None	Dropped: Brown; 6–3–3	Dropped: None	Dropped: Miami; 12–8–2; Massachusetts; 10–6–5	Dropped: Brown; 9–5–4; Dartmouth; 7–3–6	Dropped: Ohio State; 15–12–0; Massachusetts; 11–7–5	Dropped: Colorado College; 13–10–3; Cornell; 8–7–6; Michigan State; 15–13–1	Dropped: None	Dropped: Colgate; 16–9–5	Dropped: Colorado College; 16–13–3; Brown; 14–8–5	Dropped: Massachusetts; 16–9–6	Dropped: Colorado College; 18–15–3	Dropped: St. Cloud State; 18–16–4	Dropped: Colorado College; 20–16–3; Colgate; 22–12–5	Dropped: None	Dropped: Massachusetts; 19–12–6	

== USCHO.com Division I Men's Poll ==
	Preseason Sep 29	Week 1 Oct 6	Week 2 Oct 13	Week 3 Oct 20	Week 4 Oct 27	Week 5 Nov 3	Week 6 Nov 10	Week 7 Nov 17	Week 8 Nov 24	Week 9 Dec 1	Week 10 Dec 8	Week 11 Dec 15	Week 12 Dec 29	Week 13 Jan 5	Week 14 Jan 12	Week 15 Jan 19	Week 16 Jan 26	Week 17 Feb 2	Week 18 Feb 9	Week 19 Feb 16	Week 20 Feb 23	Week 21 Mar 1	Week 22 Mar 8	Week 23 Mar 15	Week 24 Mar 22	
1	Minnesota (25)	Minnesota (33) 0–0–0	Boston College (30) 2–0–1	New Hampshire (17) 2–0–0	Maine (23) 5–0–0	Maine (30) 7–0–0	North Dakota (33) 6–1–0	North Dakota (20) 7–2–0	North Dakota (36) 9–2–0	North Dakota (36) 9–2–0	North Dakota (36) 9–2–0	North Dakota (36) 11–2–0	North Dakota (32) 13–2–0	North Dakota (40) 14–2–1	North Dakota (39) 15–2–2	North Dakota (39) 17–2–2	North Dakota (26) 18–3–2	North Dakota (27) 19–3–3	Boston College (36) 20–3–4	Boston College (40) 23–3–4	Boston College (40) 25–3–4	North Dakota (22) 24–6–3	North Dakota (40) 26–6–3	North Dakota (40) 28–6–3	Maine (21) 30–7–3	1
2	Michigan (2)	Boston College (5) 1–0–0	New Hampshire (7) 1–0–0	Boston College (18) 3–1–1	North Dakota (11) 2–1–0	North Dakota (9) 4–1–0	New Hampshire (4) 6–1–0	Boston College (12) 6–2–2	Boston College (2) 7–2–3	Boston College (4) 9–2–3	Boston College (4) 10–2–3	Boston College (4) 11–2–3	Boston College (8) 13–2–3	Boston College; 13–3–3	Boston College (1) 14–3–3	Boston College (1) 16–3–3	Boston College (14) 18–3–3	Boston College (13) 19–3–3	North Dakota (4) 19–5–3	North Dakota; 20–6–3	North Dakota; 22–6–3	Boston College (18) 26–4–4	Maine; 26–7–3	Maine; 28–7–3	North Dakota (19) 29–7–3	2
3	Boston College (2)	Michigan (1) 1–0–0	Minnesota; 1–1–0	Minnesota (2) 1–1–0	New Hampshire (2) 3–1–0	New Hampshire (1) 4–1–0	Boston College (1) 5–2–1	Maine; 9–2–0	Maine (1) 10–2–1	Maine; 10–2–1	Maine; 11–2–1	Maine; 12–2–1	Wisconsin; 12–4–4	Wisconsin; 13–4–5	Maine; 15–4–1	Maine; 16–5–1	Michigan; 16–7–1	Maine; 19–6–1	Maine; 20–6–2	Maine; 21–6–3	Maine; 23–6–3	Maine; 24–7–3	Boston College; 26–6–4	Boston College; 27–8–4	Minnesota; 26–13–3	3
4	New Hampshire (1)	New Hampshire; 0–0–0	North Dakota; 1–0–0	North Dakota; 2–1–0	Michigan (2) 6–1–0	Michigan; 7–1–0	Maine; 7–2–0	New Hampshire; 6–2–1	New Hampshire; 8–2–1	Colorado College; 8–1–3	Colorado College; 9–2–3	Wisconsin; 11–3–4	Maine; 12–4–1	Maine; 13–4–1	Wisconsin; 14–5–5	Michigan; 14–7–1	Maine; 17–6–1	Michigan; 18–7–1	Minnesota; 18–9–3	Michigan; 21–8–1	Michigan; 23–8–1	Wisconsin; 20–9–7	Minnesota-Duluth; 23–10–4	Minnesota-Duluth; 25–11–4	Boston College; 27–8–4	4
5	North Dakota	North Dakota; 1–0–0	Maine (3) 2–0–0	Maine (2) 3–0–0	Boston College (1) 3–2–1	Boston College; 3–2–1	Michigan; 8–2–0	St. Cloud State (5) 8–1–1	Colorado College; 6–1–3	New Hampshire; 9–3–1	New Hampshire; 10–4–1	Denver; 11–5–2	Denver; 13–6–3	Denver; 15–6–3	St. Cloud State; 12–7–3	Minnesota; 13–8–3	Minnesota; 14–9–3	Minnesota; 16–9–3	Michigan; 19–8–1	Minnesota-Duluth; 20–8–3	Minnesota-Duluth; 22–8–3	Minnesota-Duluth; 22–10–3	Denver; 23–10–5	Minnesota; 24–13–3	Minnesota-Duluth; 26–12–4	5
6	Boston University	Boston University; 0–0–0	Michigan; 2–1–0	Michigan; 4–1–0	Denver (1) 4–0–0	Colorado College; 5–0–1	Colorado College; 6–1–1	Colorado College; 6–1–1	Michigan; 9–3–0	Ohio State; 11–5–0	St. Cloud State; 10–4–2	New Hampshire; 10–5–2	Colorado College; 9–4–3	Colorado College; 11–4–3	Michigan; 14–7–1	Wisconsin; 14–6–6	Minnesota-Duluth; 17–8–2	Minnesota-Duluth; 17–8–2	Minnesota-Duluth; 18–8–3	Wisconsin; 17–9–6	Wisconsin; 18–9–7	Michigan; 23–10–1	Wisconsin; 20–10–8	Michigan; 25–12–2	Ohio State; 26–15–0	6
7	Harvard	Harvard; 0–0–0	Boston University; 1–0–0	Denver (1) 4–0–0	Boston University; 2–0–1	Denver; 5–1–0	St. Cloud State (2) 7–0–1	Michigan; 9–3–0	Massachusetts; 8–2–1	St. Cloud State; 9–3–2	Wisconsin; 9–3–4	Colorado College; 9–4–3	New Hampshire; 11–6–2	St. Cloud State; 12–7–3	Minnesota; 11–8–3	St. Cloud State; 13–8–3	Wisconsin; 15–7–6	Miami; 16–9–3	Wisconsin; 17–9–6	Minnesota; 18–11–3	Minnesota; 20–11–3	New Hampshire; 18–11–5	Michigan; 23–11–2	Miami; 22–12–4	Michigan; 26–13–2	7
8	Ferris State	Ferris State; 0–0–0	Harvard; 0–0–0	Boston University; 1–0–1	Colorado College; 3–0–1	Boston University; 2–1–1	Denver; 6–2–0	Denver; 7–2–1	St. Cloud State; 8–3–1	Denver; 9–4–1	Massachusetts; 9–3–2	Michigan; 11–6–1	St. Cloud State; 12–6–2	Michigan; 12–7–1	Denver; 15–8–3	New Hampshire; 14–7–3	New Hampshire; 15–7–3	St. Cloud State; 14–9–3	Miami; 18–9–3	St. Cloud State; 18–9–3	New Hampshire; 17–10–5	Denver; 21–10–5	Minnesota; 22–13–3	New Hampshire; 20–13–6	Denver; 23–12–5	8
9	Cornell	Cornell; 0–0–0	Cornell; 0–0–0	Harvard; 0–0–0	Harvard; 0–0–0	Minnesota-Duluth; 4–2–1	Massachusetts; 7–1–0	Massachusetts; 8–2–0	Ohio State; 10–5–0	Massachusetts; 9–3–2	Michigan; 10–6–0	Massachusetts; 9–4–3	Michigan; 12–7–1	Cornell; 6–2–5	New Hampshire; 12–7–3	Minnesota-Duluth; 15–8–2	St. Cloud State; 14–9–3	Wisconsin; 15–9–6	St. Cloud State; 16–9–3	New Hampshire; 16–10–5	St. Cloud State; 18–10–4	Miami; 19–11–4	Miami; 20–12–4	Denver; 23–12–5	Miami; 23–13–4	9
10	Michigan State	Colorado College; 0–0–0	Colorado College; 0–0–0	Colorado College; 2–0–0	Minnesota; 1–3–0	St. Cloud State; 5–0–1	Boston University; 2–2–1	Boston University; 3–2–2	Denver; 7–4–1	Michigan; 9–5–0	Denver; 9–5–2	St. Cloud State; 10–6–2	Cornell; 6–2–5	New Hampshire; 11–7–2	Cornell; 7–3–5	Denver; 15–8–3	Denver; 16–9–3	New Hampshire; 15–9–3	New Hampshire; 16–10–3	Miami; 18–11–3	Miami; 18–11–3	Minnesota; 20–13–3	New Hampshire; 18–12–6	Michigan State; 24–14–2	New Hampshire; 20–14–6	10
11	Colorado College	Michigan State; 0–0–0	Denver; 2–0–0	Cornell; 0–0–0	Cornell; 0–0–0	Minnesota; 2–4–0	Cornell; 2–1–1	Cornell; 3–1–2	Dartmouth; 4–0–3	Wisconsin; 8–3–3	Ohio State; 11–7–0	Ohio State; 11–7–0	Massachusetts; 9–4–5	Ohio State; 12–8–0	Colorado College; 11–6–3	Ohio State; 15–10–0	Miami; 14–9–3	Denver; 16–10–4	Brown; 14–5–4	Denver; 18–10–4	Denver; 19–10–5	Ohio State; 20–14–0	Michigan State; 22–14–2	Wisconsin; 21–12–8	Wisconsin; 21–12–8	11
12	Maine	Denver (1) 2–0–0	Ferris State; 1–1–0	Ohio State; 4–2–0	Minnesota-Duluth; 2–2–1	Massachusetts; 5–1–0	Harvard; 1–1–1	Ohio State; 8–5–0	Boston University; 3–3–3	Brown; 6–1–1	Dartmouth; 4–1–4	Brown; 6–2–2	Ohio State; 12–8–0	Dartmouth; 6–2–5	Minnesota-Duluth; 13–8–2	Cornell; 7–4–6	Colorado College; 12–9–3	Brown; 12–5–4	Denver; 16–10–4	Ohio State; 19–13–0	Ohio State; 20–14–0	Colgate; 19–10–5	Ohio State; 21–15–0	Ohio State; 23–15–0	Michigan State; 24–15–2	12
13	Denver	Maine; 0–0–0	Michigan State; 1–1–0	Providence; 4–0–0	St. Cloud State; 3–0–1	Harvard; 0–1–0	Minnesota-Duluth; 4–4–1	Harvard; 2–2–1	Cornell; 3–1–3	Dartmouth; 4–1–4	Brown; 6–2–2	Miami; 10–6–2	Dartmouth; 5–2–5	Minnesota; 9–8–3	Ohio State; 13–10–0	Notre Dame; 12–7–3	Brown; 11–5–4	Ohio State; 16–12–0	Massachusetts; 16–6–5	Brown; 14–6–5	Colgate; 18–9–5	St. Cloud State; 18–12–4	Colgate; 19–10–5	Colgate; 21–11–5	Notre Dame; 20–14–4	13
14	Ohio State	Ohio State; 1–1–0	Minnesota-Duluth; 0–2–1	Ferris State; 2–2–0	Massachusetts; 4–0–0	Ohio State; 6–3–0	Ohio State; 7–4–0	Michigan State; 7–4–1	Harvard; 2–2–1	Notre Dame; 8–3–2	Miami; 10–6–2	Dartmouth; 4–2–4	Minnesota; 9–8–1	Miami; 11–7–2	Brown; 9–4–3	Colorado College; 11–8–3	Cornell; 8–5–6	Massachusetts; 15–5–5	Ohio State; 17–13–0	Massachusetts; 16–8–5	Michigan State; 21–14–1	Michigan State; 21–14–1	Notre Dame; 18–12–4	Colorado College; 20–15–3	Colorado College; 20–16–3	14
15	Minnesota-Duluth	Minnesota-Duluth; 0–1–0	Northern Michigan; 2–0–0	Minnesota-Duluth; 0–2–1	Providence; 4–1–1	Cornell; 0–1–1	Michigan State; 6–3–1	Minnesota-Duluth †; 5–5–1	Brown; 4–1–0	Boston University; 4–4–4	Cornell; 4–2–5	Cornell; 4–2–5	Miami; 11–7–2	Brown; 8–3–3	Miami; 12–8–2	Miami; 13–9–2	Ohio State; 15–12–0	Colgate; 15–8–3	Colgate; 15–8–5	Colorado College; 16–11–3	Massachusetts; 16–9–6	Notre Dame; 17–11–4	St. Cloud State; 18–14–4	Notre Dame; 20–13–4	Harvard; 18–14–3	15
16								Brown †; 4–1–0																		16
	Preseason Sep 29	Week 1 Oct 6	Week 2 Oct 13	Week 3 Oct 20	Week 4 Oct 27	Week 5 Nov 3	Week 6 Nov 10	Week 7 Nov 17	Week 8 Nov 24	Week 9 Dec 1	Week 10 Dec 8	Week 11 Dec 15	Week 12 Dec 29	Week 13 Jan 5	Week 14 Jan 12	Week 15 Jan 19	Week 16 Jan 26	Week 17 Feb 2	Week 18 Feb 9	Week 19 Feb 16	Week 20 Feb 23	Week 21 Mar 1	Week 22 Mar 8	Week 23 Mar 15	Week 24 Mar 23	
		Dropped: None	Dropped: Ohio State; 2–2–0	Dropped: Michigan State; 1–3–0; Northern Michigan; 3–1–0	Dropped: Ohio State; 4–3–0; Ferris State; 2–4–0	Dropped: Providence; 5–2–1	Dropped: Minnesota; 2–6–0	Dropped: None	Dropped: Michigan State; 8–5–1; Minnesota-Duluth; 6–5–2	Dropped: Cornell; 3–2–4; Harvard; 3–3–1	Dropped: Notre Dame; 8–5–2; Boston University; 4–5–4	Dropped: None	Dropped: Brown; 6–3–3	Dropped: Massachusetts; 9–6–5	Dropped: Dartmouth; 6–3–5	Dropped: Brown; 9–5–4	Dropped: Notre Dame; 12–9–3	Dropped: Colorado College; 13–10–3; Cornell; 8–7–6	Dropped: None	Dropped: Colgate; 16–9–5	Dropped: Brown; 14–8–5; Colorado College; 16–13–3	Dropped: Massachusetts; 16–9–6	Dropped: None	Dropped: St. Cloud State; 18–16–4	Dropped: Colgate; 22–12–5	
