= Kevin Schaeffer =

American ice hockey player (born 1984)

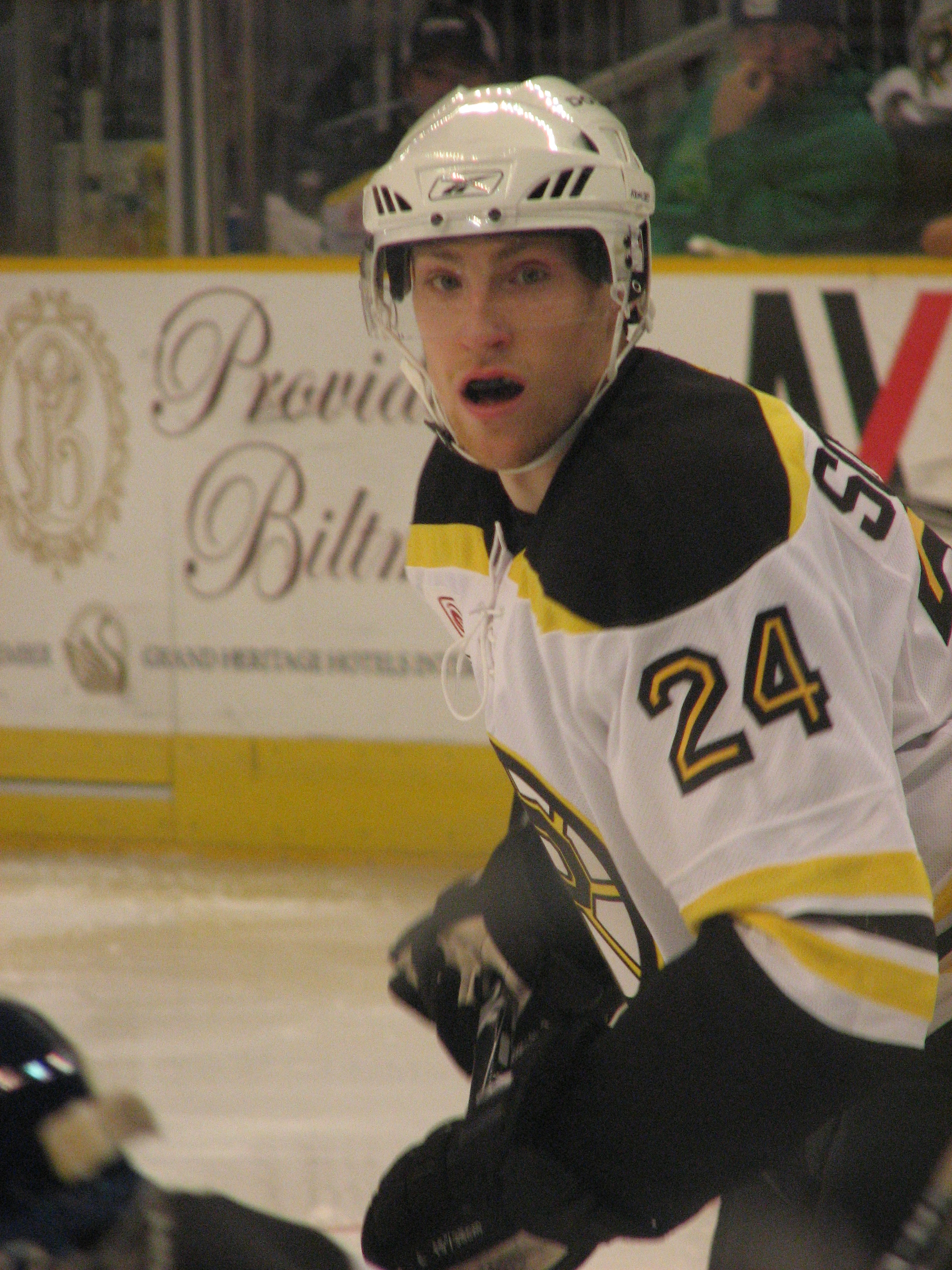
- Born: October 16, 1984 (age 41) South Huntington, New York, U.S.
- Height: 6 ft 1 in (185 cm)
- Weight: 200 lb (91 kg; 14 st 4 lb)
- Position: Defense
- Shot: Left
- Played for: Providence Bruins; Binghamton Senators; Lake Erie Monsters; Hartford Wolf Pack
- NHL draft: 193rd overall, 2004; Nashville Predators
- Playing career: 2007–2011

Kevin Schaeffer (born October 16, 1984) is an American former professional ice hockey player. He was selected by the Nashville Predators in the 6th round (193rd overall) of the 2004 NHL entry draft. Unsigned from the Predators from attending Boston University, Schaeffer played 100 games in the American Hockey League with the Providence Bruins, Binghamton Senators, Lake Erie Monsters and the Hartford Wolf Pack before deciding to retire and pursue other opportunities at the end of the 2010–11 season.

== Career statistics ==
			Regular season					Playoffs
Season	Team	League	GP	G	A	Pts	PIM	GP	G	A	Pts	PIM
2002–03	New York Apple Core	EJHL	30	8	24	32	26	—	—	—	—	—
2003–04	Boston University	HE	38	5	12	17	20	—	—	—	—	—
2004–05	Boston University	HE	41	2	12	14	26	—	—	—	—	—
2005–06	Boston University	HE	40	4	9	13	18	—	—	—	—	—
2006–07	Boston University	HE	33	6	4	10	22	—	—	—	—	—
2007–08	Reading Royals	ECHL	19	2	5	7	21	11	1	3	4	8
2007–08	Providence Bruins	AHL	31	1	1	2	6	—	—	—	—	—
2008–09	Binghamton Senators	AHL	3	0	0	0	0	—	—	—	—	—
2008–09	Reading Royals	ECHL	6	0	0	0	6	—	—	—	—	—
2008–09	Providence Bruins	AHL	48	0	3	3	14	5	0	0	0	2
2009–10	Charlotte Checkers	ECHL	52	5	7	12	25	9	0	3	3	4
2009–10	Lake Erie Monsters	AHL	7	0	2	2	2	—	—	—	—	—
2009–10	Hartford Wolf Pack	AHL	11	0	2	2	6	—	—	—	—	—
2010–11	Las Vegas Wranglers	ECHL	67	3	14	17	24	5	0	0	0	0
ECHL totals			144	10	26	36	76	25	1	6	7	12
AHL totals			100	1	8	9	28	5	0	0	0	2

== Awards and honors ==
Award	Year
All-Hockey East Rookie Team	2003–04
