= Beau Geisler =

American ice hockey player

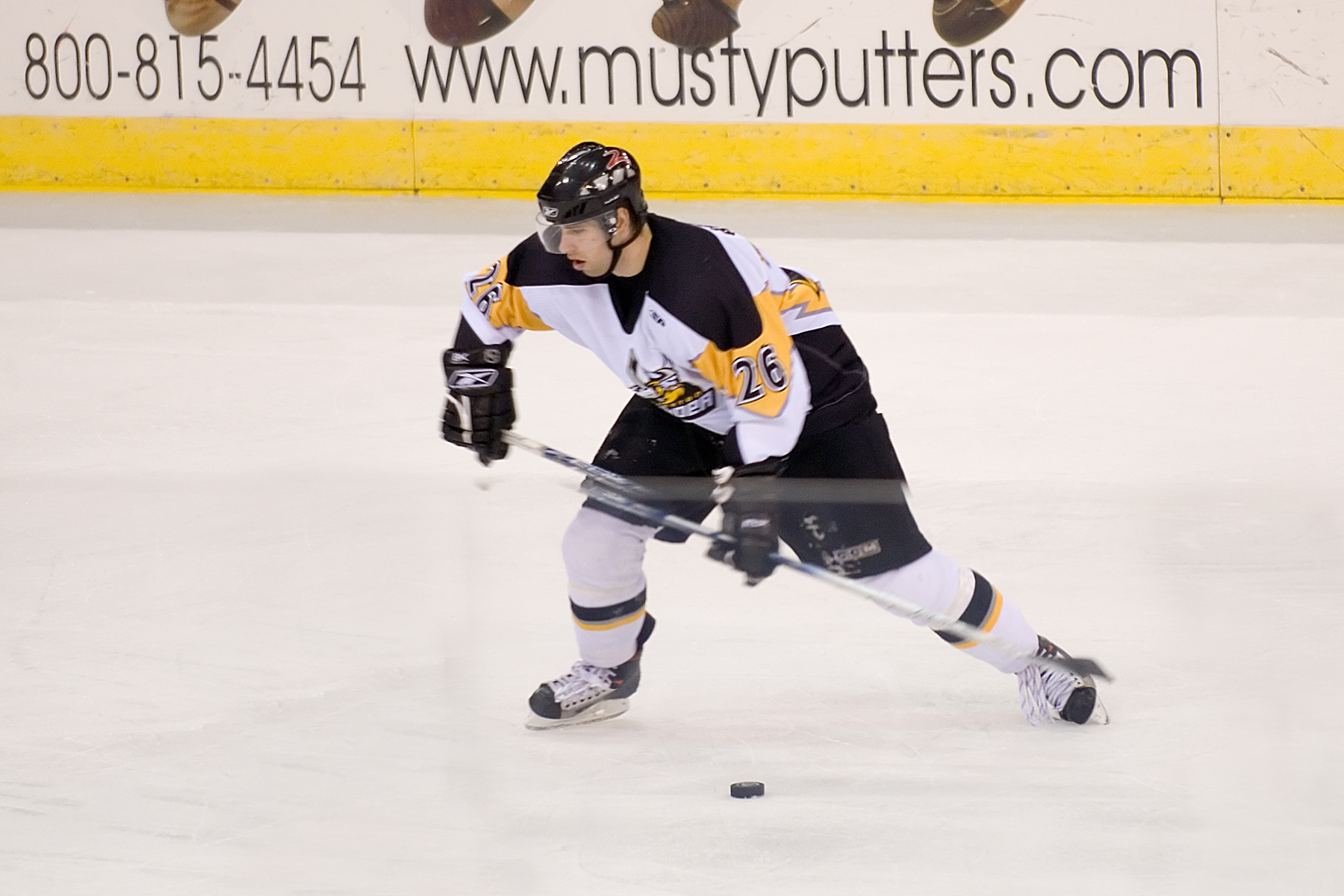
- Born: January 14, 1981 (age 45) Coleraine, Minnesota, USA
- Height: 6 ft 0 in (183 cm)
- Weight: 185 lb (84 kg; 13 st 3 lb)
- Position: Defense
- Shot: Left
- Played for: AHL; Manchester Monarchs; ECHL; Reading Royals; Stockton Thunder; LHL; HK Riga 2000
- NHL draft: Undrafted
- Playing career: 2004–2008

Beau Geisler (born January 14, 1981) is an American former professional ice hockey defenseman.

Geisler played four seasons of professional hockey, including parts of three seasons in the ECHL where he registered 13 goals and 55 assists for 68 points, while earning 84 penalty minutes, in 126 games played.

More recently, Geisler has been accused of sexual misconduct against his daughters. He no longer has custody of his children. Geisler attempted to appeal the court's decision and lost. The case documents can be found here: https://law.justia.com/cases/minnesota/court-of-appeals/2023/a22-1434.html Geisler also has possessed protective orders against his ex-wife and five children.

== Awards and honors ==
Award	Year
All-WCHA First Team	2003–04
