= Archbishop M.C. O'Neill High School =

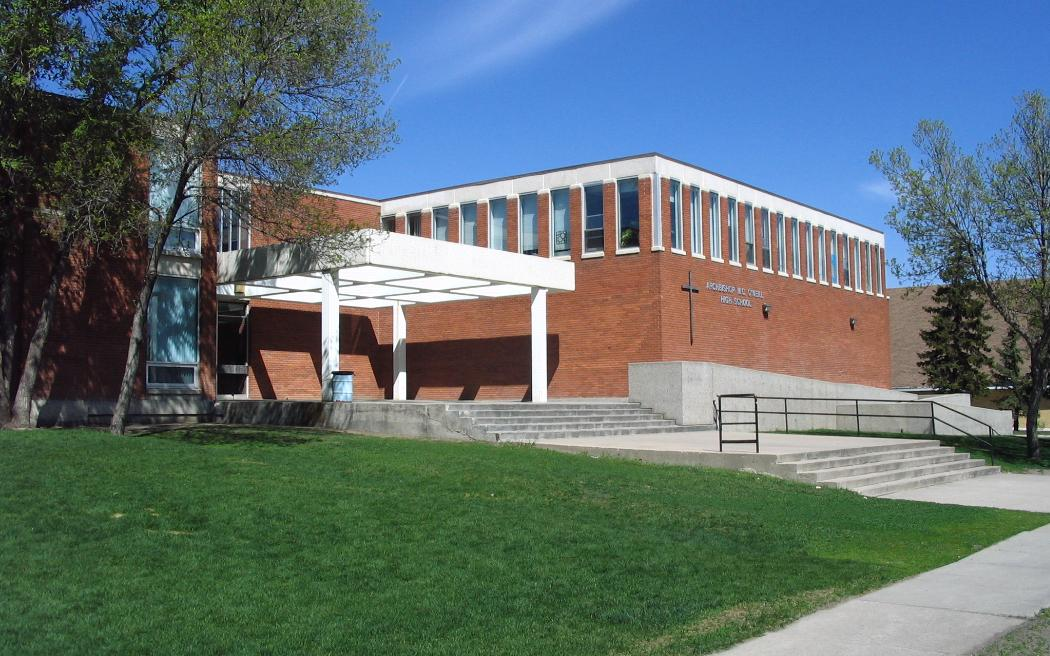

Location
- 134 Argyle Street North; Regina, Saskatchewan, S4R 4C3; Canada; 50.4775°N 104.6336°W

Information
- School type: High School
- Motto: "Domine Direge Nos" (Lord, Guide Us) (or "Blue and Gold forever!")
- Religious affiliation: Roman Catholic
- Founded: 1966
- School board: Regina Catholic School Division
- Principal: Mark Wernikowski
- Grades: 9-12
- Enrollment: 840
- Language: English, French Immersion
- Area: Regina
- Colours: Blue and Gold
- Mascot: Titan man
- Team name: Titans
- Website: archbishopmconeill.rcsd.ca

Archbishop M.C. O'Neill High School is a Catholic secondary education institute located in the Coronation Park neighbourhood of north Regina, Saskatchewan, Canada. It is officially designated as a community school. The student population is made up of individuals from the north, west, and central areas of town.

Named for a former local archbishop, Michael C. O'Neill, the school, a part of Regina Catholic Schools, offers instruction in both English and French Immersion.

Its feeder elementary schools include Sacred Heart Community School, St. Angela Merici School, St. Francis Community School, St. Gregory School, St. Joan of Arc School, St. Josaphat School, St. Mary School, St. Michael Community School, St. Peter School and St. Timothy School.

== Clubs ==
- Astronomy
- Canteen
- Assembly Band
- Drama
- Elevation Axis
- E-Sports
- Improv
- Light & Sound
- Rock Band
- SADD
- SRC
- Yearbook
- Chess

== Sports ==
- Badminton
- Basketball
- Cross Country
- Curling
- Football
- Golf
- Hockey
- Soccer
- Softball
- Track and Field
- Volleyball
- Wrestling

== Notable alumni ==
- Carm Carteri, former CFL player
- Jordan Eberle, Current NHL player for the Seattle Kraken (attended but did not graduate)
- Pat Fiacco, former mayor of Regina
- Ken McEachern, former CFL player with the Saskatchewan Roughriders
- Mike Sillinger, former NHL player
- Randy Srochenski, CFL player
- Mike Thurmeier, Academy Award-nominated animator

== Affiliated communities ==
- Argyle Park/Englewood (pop. 3990)
- Coronation Park (pop. 6555)
- Dieppe (pop. 1815)
- McNab (pop. 1505)
- Normanview (pop. 4280)
- Normanview West (pop. 3240)
- North Central (pop. 10,350)
- Northeast (pop. 7090)
- Prairie View (pop. 6325)
- Regent Park (pop. 2755)
- Rosemont/Mount Royal (pop. 8485)
- Sherwood/McCarthy (pop. 6695)
- Twin Lakes (pop. 5510)
- Uplands (pop. 5610)
- Walsh Acres/Lakeridge (pop. 7100)
