= Regina Catholic Schools =

Roman Catholic school district

The Regina Catholic School Division (RCSD), also known as Regina Catholic Schools, is a Roman Catholic school district headquartered in Regina, Saskatchewan.

The school board has seven members, and all candidates for election to the school board run in a single campaign as the board is at large.

In 2020 the board had more new members than returning members.

== Schools ==
Secondary

- Dr. Martin LeBoldus Catholic High School
- Archbishop M.C. O'Neill Catholic High School
- Miller Comprehensive Catholic High School
- Michael A. Riffel Catholic High School

Primary

- Deshaye Catholic School
- École St. Angela Merici
- École St. Elizabeth - In East Regina, it opened in 2018.
- École St. Mary
- École St. Pius
- Sacred Heart Community School
- St. Augustine Community School
- St. Bernadette School
- St. Catherine Community School
- St. Dominic Savio School
- St. Francis Community School
- St. Gabriel School
- St. Gregory School
- St. Jerome School
- St. Joan of Arc School
- St. Josaphat School
- St. Kateri Tekakwitha School
- St. Marguerite Bourgeoys School
- St. Matthew School
- St. Michael Community School
- St. Nicholas School
- St. Peter School
- St. Theresa School
- St. Timothy School

Alternative

- St. Maria Faustina School
- St. Luke School

It also has an online school

Contract

- Mother Teresa Middle School

=== Former schools ===
- St. Andrew School - Built in 1958, renovated in 2010, and closed in 2018. The building in the fall was occupied by a Conseil des écoles fransaskoises school, École du Parc. The Catholic board owns the facility and is leasing it to the French school board. The school will close circa 2023 when a new French language school will open in north Regina.
- Holy Rosary Community School - Built in the 1970s, and closed in 2024. Most of the students moved to Sacred Heart Community School and school did not get replaced yet.

== See also ==
- List of schools in Regina, Saskatchewan
