= 2003–04 Denver Pioneers men's ice hockey season =

Collegiate team season

NCAA Division I National Champion Lefty McFadden Invitational, Champion Denver Cup, Champion NCAA Tournament, Champion
- Conference: T–4th WCHA
- Home ice: Magness Arena

Rankings
- USCHO: #8
- USA Today: #1

Record
- Overall: 27–12–5
- Conference: 13–10–5
- Home: 13–9–1
- Road: 8–3–4
- Neutral: 6–0–0

Coaches and captains
- Head coach: George Gwozdecky
- Assistant coaches: Seth Appert; Chris Laperle; Steve Miller
- Captain: Ryan Caldwell
- Alternate captain(s): Max Bull; Connor James; Kevin Ulanski

The 2003–04 Denver Pioneers men's ice hockey season was the 55th season of play for the program and 45th in the WCHA. The Pioneers represented the University of Denver in the 2003–04 NCAA Division I men's ice hockey season, played their home games at Magness Arena and were coached by George Gwozdecky, in his 10th season. The team won the 2004 NCAA Division I men's ice hockey tournament, the 6th title in program history.

== Season ==
Entering the season, Denver was in a bit of a slump. The Pioneers were seven years removed from their last NCAA tournament win and had made just 1 appearance in the Frozen Four since 1972. While the team was ranked entering the season, Denver was outside the top-10 and not one of the favorites to challenge for the championship. The Pioneers started well, winning their first six games of the year, but they stumbled a bit once they began their conference schedule. Splits against schools like Minnesota and Colorado College didn't harm their standing, however, getting badly beaten twice by North Dakota at home didn't engender much faith from the voters. The Pioneers played up and down though the first half of their season but did settle on a few facts; Adam Berkhoel was their starting goalie and without him they didn't have much of a chance.

As the season progressed, it became apparent that while Denver could score goals, they did not have the high-end offense that some of their contemporaries did. None of the players reached 20 goals on the year and only Gabe Gauthier managed to average a point per game. On the back end, their defense was no juggernaut either; while allowing 27 shots against per game wasn't bad, it was hardly world-beating. Berkhoel was key for the team's chances and while he turned in several sterling performances, the senior netminder would go through bad stretches during the season. Denver also had a slight disadvantage of playing in the WCHA, which was typically regarded as the best conference in college hockey. When they hit the winter break, Denver had a solid record overall but were under .500 in conference play. After resuming their season in January, Denver won 4 games in a row but then followed that up with a 1–4–1 stretch against WCHA teams. With their ranking having dropped to #12, the Pioneers were in danger of missing out on the NCAA Tournament and needed to arrest their slide.

After a week off at the beginning of February, the Pioneers appeared to steady themselves and didn't drop another game for the remainder of the regular season. The team went 7–0–1 over the final four weeks and put themselves into the top-5. With their postseason position essentially guaranteed, Denver began the conference tournament against long-time rival Colorado College at home. After a lackluster loss in the first game, Denver's defense collapsed and allowed 6 goals to the Tigers. The poor performance knocked the Pioneers out and dropped their ranking by several spots. While the team would still make the national tournament, the losses meant that they would have to open against a stronger opponent in the first game.

=== NCAA Tournament ===
Denver's final ranking by the selection committee was 8th, good enough for the final 2-seed and a spot in the Western Regional final, located in Colorado Springs. Behind a partisan crowd, the Pioneers took on Miami and got off to a good start. team captain Ryan Caldwell opened the scoring with a short-handed marker in the first and then played a strong defensive game to hold off the RedHawks. The two traded goals in the final two periods but Miami was never able to tie the game and Denver skated away with a narrow victory.

For their second match of the tournament, Denver had to go through the #1 overall seed, North Dakota. The Fighting Sioux had easily taken the season series and were looking to put the Pioneers down with another embarrassing loss but Berkhoel would have none of it. While Denver was outshot 17–33 in the game, not a single one went into the Pioneer cage. Denver's offense was anemic all game and the scoresheet sat empty for over 57 minutes. Just when it appeared that overtime was inevitable, junior Luke Fulghum deflected a shot from Max Bull into the net. North Dakota desperately tried to even the score but the horn sounded before they would score and Denver was off to Boston.

In the national semifinal, things couldn't have started worse for the Pioneers. Minnesota–Duluth scored twice in the first five minutes of the game and, after Denver gave Duluth four additional power play opportunities, it appeared that the Bulldogs were going to roll over the Pioneers. Somehow, Berkhoel and the defense held and prevented UMD's lead from increasing. A more even second period gave Denver the chance they needed and Fulghum cut the lead in half near the mid-point of the game. Unfortunately, a 6th power play opportunity for Minnesota–Duluth saw them regain their 2-goal edge and Denver needed a mammoth effort in the final frame if they wanted their season to continue. The Pioneers came out swinging in the third and Connor James scored in the third minute. Just 34 seconds later, Caldwell added a marker and suddenly Denver was in a tie game. Duluth called a timeout to settle their players down but Denver had all the momentum and they continued to press the attack. Lukas Dora, who had taken the penalty that had led to UMD's third goal, redeemed himself by giving Denver its first lead of the game. The defense then turned in a masterful performance to limit the Bulldogs' scoring opportunities and the Pioneers bled the clock for the final 11 minutes. An empty-net goal sealed the deal and put Denver in the championship match for the first time in 35 years.

In the final game of the year, Maine was all that stood between Denver and the program's 6th title. While the Black Bears had a good offense, they had produced one of the top defensive seasons in the history of college hockey. The opposition was led by goaltender Jimmy Howard, who had set numerous NCAA records that season, including save percentage and goals against average. Playing as the underdog, Denver got off to a slow start and allowed Maine to open the scoring on their first power play of the game. The Pioneers were then beneficiaries of a very controversial ruling by the officials when the goal was waved off. Mike Hamilton was ruled to have committed a crease violation by having his skate be inside the protected area before the puck entered the goal crease. While he had not materially contributed to the goal, it was enough of an infraction to wave off the goal, much to the ire of the partisan audience. Seven minutes later, while on a power play of their own, James found Gauthier alone in the slot and the senior center scored the first official goal of the game. Neither team played particularly well on offense for the rest of the contest and it was typified by strong defensive play and penalties. Over the final two periods, the two teams combined for twelve minor penalties and six power play opportunities but just 34 shots. Denver was able to ride its narrow lead for most of the game and as time ticked away they grew closer and closer to the title. With just over 2 minutes left on the clock, Matt Laatsch was called for hooking and sent Maine to the power play for the 6th time that night. On one of the Black Bears' zone entries, Gabe Gauthier snagged the puck out of the air and tossed it back down the ice. The referees ruled that he had closed his hand on the puck and handed him a 2-minute penalty for delay of game. Now Denver found itself having to defend a 3-on-5 disadvantage for the final 90 seconds of the game, a situation made all the more precarious when Maine pulled their goaltender to give them twice as many skaters as the Pioneers. The final stretch of the game would go down in college hockey lore as one of the more stunning defensive efforts but neither the defense nor Berkhoel nor the post would give an inch and Maine failed to score. A missed pass to the point helped Denver run out the clock and win the national championship.

== Departures ==
Player	Position	Nationality	Cause
Greg Barber	Forward	Canada	Graduation (signed with San Diego Gulls)
Kevin Doell	Forward	Canada	Graduation (signed with Chicago Wolves)
Wade Dubielewicz	Goaltender	Canada	Graduation (signed with New York Islanders)
Chris Ellis	Goaltender	United States	Left program (retired)
Jason Grahame	Defenseman	United States	Graduation (retired)
J. J. Hartmann	Forward	United States	Graduation (signed with Long Beach Ice Dogs)
Aaron MacKenzie	Defenseman	Canada	Graduation (signed with Worcester IceCats)
Matt Weber	Defenseman	United States	Left program

== Recruiting ==
Player	Position	Nationality	Age	Notes
Matt Carle	Defenseman	United States	19	Anchorage, AK; selected 47th overall in 2003
J. D. Corbin	Forward	United States	18	Littleton, CO
Glenn Fisher	Goaltender	Canada	20	Edmonton, AB; selected 148th overall in 2002
Michael Handza	Forward	United States	19	Glenshaw, PA
Ryan Helgason	Forward	United States	19	Woodbury, MN
Jon James	Defenseman	United States	20	Arnold, MO
Danny King	Goaltender	United States	21	Colorado Springs, CO
Jeff Rogers	Forward	United States	19	Colorado Springs, CO
Adrian Veideman	Defenseman	Canada	20	Sicamous, BC

== Roster ==
As of August 12, 2021.

No.	Nat.	Player	Class	Pos	Height	Weight	DoB	Hometown	Previous team	NHL rights
4		Brett Skinner	Sophomore	D	6' 1" (1.85 m)	194 lb (88 kg)	1983-06-28	Brandon, Manitoba	Des Moines Buccaneers (USHL)	VAN, 68th overall 2002
5		Scott Drewicki	Sophomore	D	6' 0" (1.83 m)	190 lb (86 kg)	1983-10-09	St. Albert, Alberta	St. Albert Saints (AJHL)	—
6		Michael Handza	Freshman	F	6' 1" (1.85 m)	209 lb (95 kg)	1983-12-29	Glenshaw, Pennsylvania	Pittsburgh Forge (NAHL)	—
7		Adrian Veideman	Freshman	D	6' 2" (1.88 m)	190 lb (86 kg)	1983-04-13	Sicamous, British Columbia	Salmon Arm Silverbacks (BCHL)	—
8		Jon James	Freshman	D	6' 1" (1.85 m)	190 lb (86 kg)	1983-09-24	Arnold, Missouri	Chicago Freeze (NAHL)	—
9		Gabe Gauthier	Sophomore	F	5' 9" (1.75 m)	196 lb (89 kg)	1984-01-20	Torrance, California	Chilliwack Chiefs (BCHL)	—
10		Ryan Helgason	Freshman	F	6' 0" (1.83 m)	194 lb (88 kg)	1984-05-02	Woodbury, Minnesota	Fairbanks Ice Dogs (NAHL)	—
11		J. D. Corbin	Freshman	F	5' 10" (1.78 m)	185 lb (84 kg)	1985-03-23	Littleton, Colorado	USNTDP (USHL)	—
12		Matt Carle	Sophomore	D	6' 0" (1.83 m)	196 lb (89 kg)	1984-09-25	Anchorage, Alaska	River City Lancers (USHL)	SJS, 47th overall 2003
13		Lukas Dora	Senior	F	5' 10" (1.78 m)	181 lb (82 kg)	1980-08-12	Lednice, Czechoslovakia	HC Dukla Jihlava (Czech 2)	—
14		Max Bull (A)	Senior	F	5' 10" (1.78 m)	190 lb (86 kg)	1981-07-21	Faribault, Minnesota	Sioux City Musketeers (USHL)	—
15		Jonathan Foster	Junior	F	5' 10" (1.78 m)	185 lb (84 kg)	1982-08-03	Suffern, New York	Dubuque Fighting Saints (USHL)	—
16		Kevin Ulanski (A)	Junior	F	5' 11" (1.8 m)	190 lb (86 kg)	1982-05-19	Madison, Wisconsin	Billings Bulls (NAHL)	—
17		Luke Fulghum	Junior	F	5' 11" (1.8 m)	183 lb (83 kg)	1980-10-16	Colorado Springs, Colorado	Dubuque Fighting Saints (USHL)	—
18		Ted O'Leary	Sophomore	F	5' 11" (1.8 m)	201 lb (91 kg)	1982-09-01	Arvada, Colorado	Cedar Rapids Roughriders (USHL)	—
19		Connor James (A)	Senior	F	5' 10" (1.78 m)	176 lb (80 kg)	1982-08-25	Calgary, Alberta	Calgary Royals (AJHL)	LAK, 279th overall 2002
20		Jussi Halme	Junior	D	6' 0" (1.83 m)	181 lb (82 kg)	1980-08-24	Nokia, Finland	Tappara U20 (U20 SM-sarja)	—
21		Ryan Caldwell (C)	Senior	D	6' 3" (1.91 m)	212 lb (96 kg)	1981-06-15	Brandon, Manitoba	Thunder Bay Flyers (USHL)	NYI, 202nd overall 2000
22		Jeff Rogers	Freshman	F	6' 1" (1.85 m)	185 lb (84 kg)	1984-01-26	Colorado Springs, Colorado		—
23		Brock McMorris	Sophomore	F	5' 11" (1.8 m)	185 lb (84 kg)	1983-02-01	Cherry Hills, Colorado	Topeka Scarecrows (USHL)	—
24		Adam Berkhoel	Senior	G	5' 11" (1.8 m)	185 lb (84 kg)	1981-05-16	Saint Paul, Minnesota	Twin City Vulcans (USHL)	CHI, 240th overall 2000
25		Greg Keith	Senior	F	5' 10" (1.78 m)	190 lb (86 kg)	1980-07-26	Delta, British Columbia	Chilliwack Chiefs (BCHL)	—
26		Nick Larson	Junior	D	6' 3" (1.91 m)	196 lb (89 kg)	1980-11-08	Moorhead, Minnesota	Dubuque Fighting Saints (USHL)	—
27		Matt Laatsch	Junior (RS)	D	6' 3" (1.91 m)	201 lb (91 kg)	1980-08-19	Lakeville, Minnesota	Dubuque Fighting Saints (USHL)	—
28		Glenn Fisher	Freshman	G	6' 1" (1.85 m)	190 lb (86 kg)	1983-04-25	Edmonton, Alberta	Fort Saskatchewan Traders (AJHL)	EDM, 148th overall 2002
30		Danny King	Freshman	G	5' 10" (1.78 m)	170 lb (77 kg)	1982-05-08	Colorado Springs, Colorado	Huntsville Wildcats (OPJHL)	—
37		Scott McConnell	Senior	F	5' 10" (1.78 m)	216 lb (98 kg)	1979-02-07	Colorado Springs, Colorado	Cedar Rapids Roughriders (USHL)	—
39		Jeff Drummond	Junior	F	5' 7" (1.7 m)	170 lb (77 kg)	1982-08-04	Leduc, Alberta	Fort McMurray Oil Barons (AJHL)	—

== Standings ==
2003–04 Western Collegiate Hockey Association standings
	Conference							Overall					
	GP	W	L	T	PTS	GF	GA	GP	W	L	T	GF	GA
#5 North Dakota†	28	20	5	3	43	122	62	41	30	8	3	182	90
#4 Minnesota–Duluth	28	19	7	2	40	119	71	45	28	13	4	185	123
#8 Wisconsin	28	14	7	7	35	85	62	43	22	13	8	123	93
#1 Denver	28	13	10	5	31	93	90	44	27	12	5	149	120
#6 Minnesota*	28	15	12	1	31	101	86	44	27	14	3	178	127
St. Cloud State	28	12	12	4	28	81	89	38	18	16	4	113	118
#15 Colorado College	28	11	15	2	24	77	75	39	20	16	3	126	98
Alaska–Anchorage	28	7	18	3	17	68	103	40	14	23	3	104	140
Minnesota State	28	6	18	4	16	83	139	39	10	24	5	124	179
Michigan Tech	28	6	19	3	15	66	118	38	8	25	5	97	161
Championship: Minnesota † indicates conference regular season champion * indicates conference tournament champion Final rankings: USA Today/American Hockey Magazine Poll Top 15 Poll

== Schedule and results ==
Date	Time	Opponent^{#}	Rank^{#}	Site	TV	Decision	Result	Attendance	Record
Lefty McFadden Invitational
October 3	3:05 PM	vs. #14 Ohio State*	#13	Nutter Center • Dayton, Ohio (Lefty McFadden Invitational semifinal)		Berkhoel	W 5–2	—	1–0–0
October 4	5:37 PM	vs. St. Lawrence*	#13	Nutter Center • Dayton, Ohio (Lefty McFadden Invitational championship)		Berkhoel	W 3–0	2,610	2–0–0
Exhibition
October 10	7:37 PM	vs. USNTDP*	#12	Magness Arena • Denver, Colorado (Exhibition)		Fisher	W 6–2	2,214	
October 11	6:06 PM	vs. British Columbia*	#12	Magness Arena • Denver, Colorado (Exhibition)		Berkhoel	W 6–4	3,364	
Regular Season
October 17	7:36 PM	vs. Northeastern*	#11	Magness Arena • Denver, Colorado		Berkhoel	W 5–2	3,762	3–0–0
October 18	7:06 PM	vs. Northeastern*	#11	Magness Arena • Denver, Colorado		Fisher	W 6–3	5,729	4–0–0
October 31	6:05 PM	at #10 Minnesota	#6	Mariucci Arena • Minneapolis, Minnesota		Berkhoel	L 2–6	9,697	4–1–0 (0–1–0)
November 1	6:05 PM	at #10 Minnesota	#6	Mariucci Arena • Minneapolis, Minnesota		Berkhoel	W 4–3	10,082	5–1–0 (1–1–0)
November 7	7:35 PM	at #6 Colorado College	#7	Colorado Springs World Arena • Colorado Springs, Colorado (Rivalry)		Berkhoel	W 5–2	7,719	6–1–0 (2–1–0)
November 8	7:08 PM	vs. #6 Colorado College	#7	Magness Arena • Denver, Colorado (Rivalry)		Berkhoel	L 1–4	6,087	6–2–0 (2–2–0)
November 14	9:06 PM	at Alaska–Anchorage	#8	Sullivan Arena • Anchorage, Alaska		Fisher	T 4–4 ^{OT}	4,141	6–2–1 (2–2–1)
November 15	9:05 PM	at Alaska–Anchorage	#8	Sullivan Arena • Anchorage, Alaska		Berkhoel	W 4–0	4,526	7–2–1 (3–2–1)
November 21	7:07 PM	vs. #1 North Dakota	#8	Magness Arena • Denver, Colorado (Rivalry)		Berkhoel	L 2–8	5,960	7–3–1 (3–3–1)
November 22	7:05 PM	vs. #1 North Dakota	#8	Magness Arena • Denver, Colorado (Rivalry)		Fisher	L 2–6	4,916	7–4–1 (3–4–1)
November 28	7:35 PM	vs. Findlay*	#10	Magness Arena • Denver, Colorado		Berkhoel	W 4–0	4,305	8–4–1
November 29	7:05 PM	at Air Force*	#10	Cadet Ice Arena • Colorado Springs, Colorado		Berkhoel	W 4–1	2,141	9–4–1
December 5	7:35 PM	vs. #11 Wisconsin	#8	Magness Arena • Denver, Colorado		Berkhoel	T 2–2 ^{OT}	4,144	9–4–2 (3–4–2)
December 6	7:06 PM	vs. #11 Wisconsin	#8	Magness Arena • Denver, Colorado		Berkhoel	L 1–3	4,726	9–5–2 (3–5–2)
December 12	6:05 PM	at #6 St. Cloud State	#10	National Hockey Center • St. Cloud, Minnesota		Berkhoel	W 4–1	6,052	10–5–2 (4–5–2)
December 13	6:05 PM	at #6 St. Cloud State	#10	National Hockey Center • St. Cloud, Minnesota		Berkhoel	W 3–2	6,157	11–5–2 (5–5–2)
December 19	6:05 PM	at Minnesota State–Mankato	#5	Midwest Wireless Civic Center • Mankato, Minnesota		Berkhoel	T 4–4 ^{OT}	3,190	11–5–3 (5–5–3)
December 20	6:05 PM	at Minnesota State–Mankato	#5	Midwest Wireless Civic Center • Mankato, Minnesota		Berkhoel	L 7–8	3,650	11–6–3 (5–6–3)
Denver Cup
December 27	7:06 PM	vs. Niagara*	#8	Magness Arena • Denver, Colorado (Denver Cup semifinal)		Fisher	W 3–2	5,265	12–6–3
December 28	7:18 PM	vs. Nebraska–Omaha*	#8	Magness Arena • Denver, Colorado (Denver Cup championship)		Berkhoel	W 6–3	4,657	13–6–3
January 2	7:35 PM	vs. St. Lawrence*	#5	Magness Arena • Denver, Colorado		Berkhoel	W 2–0	3,185	14–6–3
January 3	7:04 PM	vs. Wayne State*	#5	Magness Arena • Denver, Colorado		Fisher	W 4–2	3,058	15–6–3
January 9	7:36 PM	vs. Minnesota–Duluth	#5	Magness Arena • Denver, Colorado		Berkhoel	L 0–1	3,875	15–7–3 (5–7–3)
January 10	7:05 PM	vs. Minnesota–Duluth	#5	Magness Arena • Denver, Colorado		Berkhoel	L 3–6	5,057	15–8–3 (5–8–3)
January 23	7:35 PM	vs. Alaska–Anchorage	#10	Magness Arena • Denver, Colorado		Berkhoel	W 2–1 ^{OT}	3,996	16–8–3 (6–8–3)
January 24	7:04 PM	vs. Alaska–Anchorage	#10	Magness Arena • Denver, Colorado		Berkhoel	L 3–5	5,132	16–9–3 (6–9–3)
January 30	6:35 PM	at #1 North Dakota	#10	Ralph Engelstad Arena • Grand Forks, North Dakota (Rivalry)		Berkhoel	L 1–6	11,295	16–10–3 (6–10–3)
January 31	6:05 PM	at #1 North Dakota	#10	Ralph Engelstad Arena • Grand Forks, North Dakota (Rivalry)		Berkhoel	T 1–1 ^{OT}	11,668	16–10–4 (6–10–4)
February 13	7:35 PM	vs. Minnesota State	#12	Magness Arena • Denver, Colorado		Berkhoel	W 7–1	4,436	17–10–4 (7–10–4)
February 14	7:04 PM	vs. Minnesota State	#12	Magness Arena • Denver, Colorado		Berkhoel	W 9–7	4,640	18–10–4 (8–10–4)
February 20	5:05 PM	at Michigan Tech	#11	MacInnes Student Ice Arena • Houghton, Michigan		Berkhoel	T 1–1 ^{OT}	2,004	18–10–5 (8–10–5)
February 21	5:05 PM	at Michigan Tech	#11	MacInnes Student Ice Arena • Houghton, Michigan		Berkhoel	W 3–0	2,401	19–10–5 (9–10–5)
February 27	7:35 PM	vs. #7 Minnesota	#11	Magness Arena • Denver, Colorado		Berkhoel	W 6–2	6,050	20–10–5 (10–10–5)
February 28	7:04 PM	vs. #7 Minnesota	#11	Magness Arena • Denver, Colorado		Berkhoel	W 6–3	6,081	21–10–5 (11–10–5)
March 4	7:35 PM	at Colorado College	#8	Colorado Springs World Arena • Colorado Springs, Colorado (Rivalry)		Berkhoel	W 3–1	7,566	22–10–5 (12–10–5)
March 5	7:35 PM	vs. Colorado College	#8	Magness Arena • Denver, Colorado (Rivalry)		Berkhoel	W 3–2	5,918	23–10–5 (13–10–5)
WCHA Tournament
March 11	7:36 PM	vs. Colorado College*	#5	Magness Arena • Denver, Colorado (Rivalry; WCHA First Round Game 1)		Berkhoel	L 3–4	4,391	23–11–5
March 12	7:05 PM	vs. Colorado College*	#5	Magness Arena • Denver, Colorado (Rivalry; WCHA First Round Game 2)		Berkhoel	L 1–6	4,732	23–12–5
Denver Lost Series 0-2
NCAA Tournament
March 26	9:05 PM	vs. #9 Miami*	#8	Colorado Springs World Arena • Colorado Springs, Colorado (West Regional semifinal)		Berkhoel	W 3–2	5,352	24–12–5
March 27	7:05 PM	vs. #2 North Dakota*	#8	Colorado Springs World Arena • Colorado Springs, Colorado (Rivalry; West Regional championship)		Berkhoel	W 1–0	6,047	25–12–5
April 8	10:07 AM	vs. #5 Minnesota–Duluth*	#8	FleetCenter • Boston, Massachusetts (National semifinals)	ESPN2	Berkhoel	W 5–3	18,084	26–12–5
April 10	5:05 PM	vs. #1 Maine*	#8	FleetCenter • Boston, Massachusetts (National Championship)	ESPN	Berkhoel	W 1–0	18,597	27–12–5
*Non-conference game. ^{#}Rankings from USCHO.com Poll. All times are in Mountain Time. Source:

== National Championship ==
=== (E1) Maine vs. (W2) Denver ===
April 10	Maine	0 – 1	Denver	FleetCenter	Recap

Scoring summary
Period	Team	Goal	Assist(s)	Time	Score
1st	DEN	Gabe Gauthier (18) – GW PP	James	12:26	1–0 DEN
2nd	None				
3rd	None				
Penalty summary
Period	Team	Player	Penalty	Time	PIM
1st	DEN	Max Bull	Checking from Behind	3:39	2:00
1st	DEN	Gabe Gauthier	Roughing	5:13	2:00
1st	Maine	Dustin Penner	Holding the Stick	5:13	2:00
1st	Maine	Mathew Deschamps	Obstruction Interference	11:49	2:00
1st	DEN	Max Bull	Cross-Checking	13:25	2:00
1st	Maine	Jon Jankus	Tripping	14:24	2:00
1st	DEN	J. D. Corbin	Holding	17:03	2:00
2nd	Maine	Todd Jackson	Tripping	26:26	2:00
2nd	DEN	Gabe Gauthier	Cross-Checking	26:31	2:00
2nd	Maine	Jon Jankus	Holding the Stick	26:31	2:00
2nd	DEN	Jeff Drummond	HK	28:16	2:00
2nd	DEN	Ryan Caldwell	Roughing	29:47	2:00
2nd	Maine	Mike Hamilton	Roughing	29:47	2:00
3rd	DEN	Jeff Drummond	Obstruction Holding	43:24	2:00
3rd	Maine	Prestin Ryan	Interference	48:09	2:00
3rd	DEN	Jon Foster	Roughing	52:15	2:00
3rd	Maine	Mathew Deschamps	Roughing	52:15	2:00
3rd	DEN	Matt Laatsch	Hooking	57:51	2:00
3rd	DEN	Gabe Gauthier	Delay of Game	58:26	2:00

Shots by period
Team	1	2	3	T
Denver	4	6	10	20
Maine	6	9	9	24

Goaltenders
Team	Name	Saves	Goals against	Time on ice
DEN	Adam Berkhoel	24	0	60:00
Maine	Jimmy Howard	19	1	58:39

== Scoring statistics ==
Name	Position	Games	Goals	Assists	Points	PIM
Gabe Gauthier	C	42	18	25	43	32
Connor James	C	40	13	25	38	16
Lukas Dora	F	42	14	22	36	74
Brett Skinner	D	44	7	23	30	32
Jeff Drummond	F	43	13	15	28	32
Ryan Caldwell	D	42	15	12	27	96
Matt Carle	D	30	5	20	25	33
Luke Fulghum	LW	43	14	9	23	20
Kevin Ulanski	F	42	7	15	22	22
Jon Foster	LW	42	12	6	18	30
Greg Keith	F	40	10	8	18	97
Max Bull	F	44	2	12	14	44
Jussi Halme	D	38	2	11	13	16
Matt Laatsch	D	41	5	7	12	65
Adrian Veideman	D	42	4	7	11	26
J. D. Corbin	LW	39	3	6	9	18
Ryan Helgason	F	32	3	2	5	43
Ted O'Leary	F	19	1	4	5	0
Michael Handza	F	44	1	4	5	40
Adam Berkhoel	G	39	0	2	2	0
Glenn Fisher	G	9	0	1	1	0
Nick Larson	D	30	0	1	1	6
Scott McConnell	F	1	0	0	0	0
Scott Drewicki	D	3	0	0	0	0
Jeff Rogers	F	3	0	0	0	0
Brock McMorris	F	5	0	0	0	0
Total			149	237	386	752

== Goaltending statistics ==
Name	Games	Minutes	Wins	Losses	Ties	Goals against	Saves	Shut outs	SV %	GAA
Adam Berkhoel	39	2224:44	24	11	4	91	1020	7	.918	2.45
Glenn Fisher	9	435:53	3	1	1	26	177	0	.872	3.58
Empty Net	-	6:25	-	-	-	3	-	-	-	-
Total	44	2667	27	11	5	120	1197	7	.909	2.70

== Rankings ==
Poll	Week																											
Poll	Pre	1	2	3	4	5	6	7	8	9	10	11	12	13	14	15	16	17	18	19	20	21	22	23	24	25	26	27 (Final)
USCHO.com	13	12 (1)	11	7 (1)	6 (1)	7	8	8	10	8	10	5	-	5	5	8	10	10	11	12	11	11	8	5	9	8	-	-
USA Today	12	10	10	8	6 (1)	7	8	8	10	8	10	5	8	6	6	7	10	10	11	12	10	11	7	6	9	9	4	1 (34)

Note: USCHO did not release a poll in weeks 12, 26 and 27.

== Awards and honors ==
Player	Award	Ref
Adam Berkhoel	NCAA Tournament Most Outstanding Player	
Ryan Caldwell	AHCA West First Team All-American	
Ryan Caldwell	WCHA Defensive Player of the Year	
Connor James	WCHA Student-Athlete of the Year	
Ryan Caldwell	All-WCHA Second Team	
Adam Berkhoel	All-WCHA Third Team	
Gabe Gauthier	All-WCHA Third Team	
Matt Carle	WCHA All-Rookie Team	
Adam Berkhoel	NCAA All-Tournament team	
Ryan Caldwell	NCAA All-Tournament team	
Connor James	NCAA All-Tournament team	

== Players drafted into the NHL ==
=== 2004 NHL entry draft ===
= NHL All-Star team	= NHL All-Star	= NHL All-Star and NHL All-Star team	= Did not play in the NHL

Round	Pick	Player	NHL team
2	57	Geoff Paukovich^{†}	Edmonton Oilers
3	85	Brian Gifford^{†}	Pittsburgh Penguins
8	249	J. D. Corbin	Colorado Avalanche

† incoming freshman
