= 2004 NCAA Division I men's ice hockey tournament =

- 2004 Frozen Four logo
- Teams: 16
- Finals site: FleetCenter, Boston
- Champions: Denver Pioneers (6th title)
- Runner-up: Maine Black Bears (5th title game)
- Semifinalists: Boston College Eagles (18th Frozen Four); Minnesota-Duluth Bulldogs (3rd Frozen Four)
- Winning coach: George Gwozdecky (1st title)
- MOP: Adam Berkhoel (Denver)
- Attendance: 96,327

The 2004 NCAA Division I men's ice hockey tournament involved 16 schools playing in single-elimination play to determine the national champion of men's NCAA Division I college ice hockey. It began on March 26, 2004, and ended with the championship game on April 10. A total of 15 games were played. This was the first season in which the Atlantic Hockey sent a representative to the tournament. Atlantic Hockey assumed possession of the automatic bid that had been the possession of the MAAC after it collapsed and all remaining ice hockey programs formed the new conference.

This year's tournament was the second year in a row to feature multiple programs, Holy Cross and Notre Dame, making their first appearance in the NCAA playoffs.

The University of Denver, coached by George Gwozdecky, won its sixth national title with a 1–0 victory in the final game over the University of Maine, coached by Tim Whitehead before a record crowd of over 18,000 people at Boston's FleetCenter (now known as the TD Garden). While Denver's Gabe Gauthier scored the game's only goal, the game is best remembered for Denver surviving Maine's six skaters to three skaters advantage in the final 90 seconds of the contest.

Denver goaltender Adam Berkhoel was named the tournament Most Outstanding Player.

== Game locations ==
2004 Regionals (blue) and Frozen Four (red)

The NCAA Men's Division I Ice Hockey Championship is a single-elimination tournament featuring 16 teams representing all six Division I conferences in the nation. The Championship Committee seeds the entire field from 1 to 16 within four regionals of 4 teams. The winners of the six Division I conference championships receive automatic bids to participate in the NCAA Championship. Regional placements are based primarily on the home location of the top seed in each bracket with an attempt made to put the top-ranked teams close to their home site.

=== First round and regional finals ===
- East – Pepsi Arena, Albany, New York — Host: Rensselaer
- Midwest – Van Andel Arena, Grand Rapids, Michigan — Host: Western Michigan
- Northeast – Verizon Wireless Arena, Manchester, New Hampshire — Host: New Hampshire
- West – World Arena, Colorado Springs, Colorado — Host: Colorado College

=== Frozen Four ===
- FleetCenter, Boston

== Qualifying teams ==
The at-large bids and seeding for each team in the tournament was announced on March 21, 2004. The Western Collegiate Hockey Association (WCHA) and the Central Collegiate Hockey Association (CCHA) each had five teams receive a berth in the tournament, Hockey East had three teams receive a berth in the tournament, while Atlantic Hockey, College Hockey America (CHA) and the ECAC each received a single bid for their tournament champions.

| West Regional – Colorado Springs | | | | | | | Northeast Regional – Manchester | | | | | | |
| Seed | School | Conference | Record | Berth type | Appearance | Last bid | Seed | School | Conference | Record | Berth type | Appearance | Last bid |
|---|---|---|---|---|---|---|---|---|---|---|---|---|---|
| 1 | North Dakota (1) | WCHA | 29–7–3 | At-large bid | 19th | 2003 | 1 | Boston College (2) | Hockey East | 27–8–4 | At-large bid | 24th | 2003 |
| 2 | Denver | WCHA | 23–12–5 | At-large bid | 17th | 2002 | 2 | Michigan | CCHA | 26–13–2 | At-large bid | 27th | 2003 |
| 3 | Miami | CCHA | 23–13–4 | At-large bid | 3rd | 1997 | 3 | New Hampshire | Hockey East | 20–14–6 | At-large bid | 14th | 2003 |
| 4 | Holy Cross | Atlantic Hockey | 22–9–4 | Tournament champion | 1st | Never | 4 | Niagara | CHA | 21–14–3 | Tournament champion | 2nd | 2000 |
| East Regional – Albany | | | | | | | Midwest Regional – Grand Rapids | | | | | | |
| Seed | School | Conference | Record | Berth type | Appearance | Last bid | Seed | School | Conference | Record | Berth type | Appearance | Last bid |
| 1 | Maine (3) | Hockey East | 30–7–3 | Tournament champion | 14th | 2003 | 1 | Minnesota (4) | WCHA | 26–13–3 | Tournament champion | 28th | 2003 |
| 2 | Ohio State | CCHA | 26–15–0 | Tournament champion | 4th | 2003 | 2 | Minnesota-Duluth | WCHA | 26–12–4 | At-large bid | 5th | 1993 |
| 3 | Wisconsin | WCHA | 21–12–8 | At-large bid | 20th | 2000 | 3 | Michigan State | CCHA | 23–16–2 | At-large bid | 23rd | 2002 |
| 4 | Harvard | ECAC | 18–14–3 | Tournament champion | 19th | 2003 | 4 | Notre Dame | CCHA | 20–14–4 | At-large bid | 1st | Never |

Number in parentheses denotes overall seed in the tournament.

== Bracket ==
Regional Semifinals; March 26–27
1 | North Dakota (1) | 3
4 | Holy Cross | 0
West – Colorado Springs – Fri/Sat
2 | Denver | 3
3 | Miami | 2
1 | Minnesota (4) | 5
4 | Notre Dame | 2
Midwest – Grand Rapids – Sat/Sun
2 | Minnesota–Duluth | 5
3 | Michigan State | 0
1 | Boston College (2) | 5
4 | Niagara | 2
Northeast – Manchester – Sat/Sun
2 | Michigan | 4
3 | New Hampshire | 1
1 | Maine (3) | 5
4 | Harvard | 4
East – Albany – Fri/Sat
2 | Ohio State | 0
3 | Wisconsin | 1*

Regional Finals; March 27–28
1 | North Dakota (1) | 0
2 | Denver | 1
1 | Minnesota (4) | 1
2 | Minnesota–Duluth | 3
1 | Boston College (2) | 3*
2 | Michigan | 2
1 | Maine (3) | 2*
3 | Wisconsin | 1

National Semifinals; April 8
W2 | Denver | 5
MW2 | Minnesota–Duluth | 3
NE1 | Boston College (2) | 1
E1 | Maine (3) | 2

National Championship; April 10
W2 | Denver | 1
E1 | Maine (3) | 0

Number in parentheses denotes overall seed in the tournament
Note: * denotes overtime period(s)

== Results ==
=== West Regional – Colorado Springs, Colorado ===
==== Regional Semifinals ====
| March 26, 2004; 5:30 pm | (1) North Dakota | 3–0 (1–0, 1–0, 1–0) | (4) Holy Cross | World Arena; Attendance: 5,128 |

Game reference

Jordan Parise
Goalies
Tony Quesada (out 56:18)
Ben Conway (in 56:21)
Referee:
Steve Piotrowski
Linesmen:
Paul Tunison
Barry Pochmara

| (Murray, Bochenski) Zach Parise – GW – 00:47 | 1 – 0 |
| (Z. Parise, Murray) Brandon Bochenski – PP – 38:23 | 2 – 0 |
| (Hale) Mike Prpich – 45:09 | 3 – 0 |

10 min
Penalties
8 min
37
Shots
21

| March 26, 2004; 9:00 pm | (2) Denver | 3–2 (1–0, 1–1, 1–1) | (3) Miami | World Arena; Attendance: 5,352 |

Game reference

Adam Berkhoel
Goalies
Brandon Crawford-West
Referee:
Tim Bennedetto
Linesmen:
Joe Andrews
Bob Bernard

| (Dora) Ryan Caldwell – SH – 07:01 | 1 – 0 |
| (O'Leary, Veideman) Matt Laatsch – 22:25 | 2 – 0 |
| | 2 – 1 | 27:04 – Marty Guerin (Sipotz, Nelson) |
| (Carle, Gauthier) Brett Skinner – GW PP – 46:35 | 3 – 1 |
| | 3 – 2 | 57:37 – PP – Matt Davis (unassisted) |

26 min
Penalties
23 min
33
Shots
23

==== Regional Final ====
| March 27, 2004; 7:00 pm | (1) North Dakota | 0–1 (0–0, 0–0, 0–1) | (2) Denver | World Arena; Attendance: 6,047 |

Game reference
| Jordan Parise | Goalies | Adam Berkhoel | Referee: Steve Piotrowski; Linesmen: Paul Tunison; Barry Pochmara |
| 0 – 1 / 57:31 – GW – Luke Fulghum (Bull, Dora) | | | Referee: Steve Piotrowski; Linesmen: Paul Tunison; Barry Pochmara |
| 6 min | Penalties | 6 min | Referee: Steve Piotrowski; Linesmen: Paul Tunison; Barry Pochmara |
| 33 | Shots | 17 | Referee: Steve Piotrowski; Linesmen: Paul Tunison; Barry Pochmara |

=== Northeast Regional – Manchester, New Hampshire ===
==== Regional Semifinals ====
| March 27, 2004; 12:00 pm | (1) Boston College | 5–2 (2–1, 1–1, 2–0) | (4) Niagara | Verizon Wireless Arena; Attendance: 10,104 |

Game reference

Matti Kaltiainen
Goalies
Jeff VanNynatten
Referee:
Matt Shegos
Linesmen:
Kevin Longseth
John LaDuke

| | 0 – 1 | 03:35 – Joe Tallari (Ehgoetz, Cross) |
| (Forrest, B. Eaves) Patrick Eaves – PP – 14:23 | 1 – 1 |
| (Adams) Ryan Shannon – 17:03 | 2 – 1 |
| (unassisted) Peter Harrold – GW – 33:06 | 3 – 1 |
| | 3 – 2 | 38:11 – PP – Sean Bentivoglio (Clarke, Lackner) |
| (Voce, Shannon) Patrick Eaves – PP – 42:15 | 4 – 2 |
| (Spina) Ryan Shannon – 47:13 | 5 – 2 |

14 min
Penalties
12 min
39
Shots
28

| March 27, 2004; 3:30 pm | (2) Michigan | 4–1 (1–0, 2–0, 1–1) | (3) New Hampshire | Verizon Wireless Arena; Attendance: 10,104 |

Game reference

Al Montoya
Goalies
Mike Ayers
Referee:
Derek Shepherd
Linesmen:
Kile Bergren
Dan Carey

| (unassisted) Brandon Kaleniecki – 01:05 | 1 – 0 |
| (Gajic) Andrew Ebbett – GW – 29:45 | 2 – 0 |
| (Gajic, Hensick) Eric Werner – PP – 32:06 | 3 – 0 |
| (Ebbett) Brandon Kaleniecki – 41:11 | 4 – 0 |
| | 4 – 1 | 53:46 – Nathan Martz (Collins, Saviano) |

10 min
Penalties
12 min
38
Shots
28

==== Regional Final ====
| March 28, 2004; 4:00 pm | (1) Boston College | 3–2 (OT) (0–1, 1–1, 1–0, 1–0) | (2) Michigan | Verizon Wireless Arena; Attendance: 8,439 |

Game reference

Matti Kaltiainen
Goalies
Al Montoya
Referee:
Derek Shepherd
Linesmen:
Kile Bergren
Dan Carey

| | 0 – 1 | 12:09 – Mike Brown (Burnes) |
| (B. Eaves, P. Eaves) Tony Voce – PP – 29:02 | 1 – 1 |
| | 1 – 2 | 37:01 – Andy Burnes (unassisted) |
| (Harrold, Voce) Patrick Eaves – 55:16 | 2 – 2 |
| (P. Eaves, Harrold) Ben Eaves – GW – 70:08 | 3 – 2 |

6 min
Penalties
8 min
45
Shots
17

=== East Regional – Albany, New York ===
==== Regional Semifinals ====
| March 26, 2004; 5:00 pm | (1) Maine | 5–4 (0–2, 1–2, 4–0) | (4) Harvard | Pepsi Arena |

Game reference

(out 40:00) Jimmy Howard
(in 40:00) Frank Doyle
Goalies
Dov Grumet-Morris
Referee:
Don Adam
Linesmen:
Nathan Freeman
Craig Hanson

| | 0 – 1 | 17:01 – PP – Dylan Reese (Johnson, Du) |
| | 0 – 2 | 19:43 – Brendan Bernakevitch (unassisted) |
| | 0 – 3 | 21:09 – PP – Dennis Packard (Pettit) |
| (Damon) Todd Jackson – 22:56 | 1 – 3 |
| | 1 – 4 | 36:47 – PP – Ryan Maki (unassisted) |
| (Jankus, Mushaluk) Mike Hamilton – 43:55 | 2 – 4 |
| (Shields) Prestin Ryan – PP – 46:14 | 3 – 4 |
| (unassisted) Michel Léveillé – 52:47 | 4 – 4 |
| (Léveillé) Greg Moore – GW – 55:50 | 5 – 4 |

12 min
Penalties
14 min
46
Shots
40

| March 26, 2004; 8:30 pm | (2) Ohio State | 0–1 (OT) (0–0, 0–0, 0–0, 0–1) | (3) Wisconsin | Pepsi Arena |

Game reference
| Dave Caruso | Goalies | Bernd Brückler | Referee: Tim Kotyra; Linesmen: Tom Cronin; Scott Whittemore |
| 0 – 1 / 72:03 – GW – Dan Boeser (Earl, Carlson) | | | Referee: Tim Kotyra; Linesmen: Tom Cronin; Scott Whittemore |
| 12 min | Penalties | 8 min | Referee: Tim Kotyra; Linesmen: Tom Cronin; Scott Whittemore |
| 28 | Shots | 29 | Referee: Tim Kotyra; Linesmen: Tom Cronin; Scott Whittemore |

==== Regional Final ====
| March 27, 2004; 6:00 pm | (1) Maine | 2–1 (OT) (1–0, 0–1, 0–0, 1–0) | (3) Wisconsin | Pepsi Arena; Attendance: 5,480 |

Game reference

Jimmy Howard
Goalies
Bernd Brückler
Referee:
Tim Kotyra
Linesmen:
Scott Whittemore
Tom Cronin

| (unassisted) Colin Shields – 01:32 | 1 – 0 |
| | 1 – 1 | 37:38 – Rene Bourque (Gilbert, MacMurchy) |
| (unassisted) Mike Hamilton – GW – 63:27 | 2 – 1 |

14 min
Penalties
18 min
28
Shots
37

=== Midwest Regional – Grand Rapids, Michigan ===
==== Regional Semifinals ====
| March 27, 2004; 12:00 pm | (1) Minnesota | 5–2 (0–2, 3–0, 2–0) | (4) Notre Dame | Van Andel Arena; Attendance: 5,325 |

Game reference

Kellen Briggs
Goalies
Morgan Cey
Referee:
Conrad Hache
Linesmen:
Tim Low
Tom Quinn

| | 0 – 1 | 00:54 – Cory McLean (Gill, Walsh) |
| | 0 – 2 | 19:18 – PP – Aaron Gill (Walsh, Globke) |
| (Vanek, Harrington) Matt Koalska – 20:26 | 1 – 2 |
| (Harrington, Guyer) Danny Irmen – PP – 29:13 | 2 – 2 |
| (unassisted) Thomas Vanek – GW – 36:24 | 3 – 2 |
| (Koalska, Ballard) Thomas Vanek – 51:52 | 4 – 2 |
| (unassisted) Troy Riddle – EN – 59:24 | 5 – 2 |

16 min
Penalties
16 min
22
Shots
45

| March 27, 2004; 3:30 pm | (2) Minnesota-Duluth | 5–0 (1–0, 4–0, 0–0) | (3) Michigan State | Van Andel Arena; Attendance: 5,325 |

Game reference

Issac Reichmuth
Goalies
Dominic Vicari (out 28:13)
Matt Migliaccio (in 28:13)
Referee:
Scott Hansen
Linesmen:
Kevin Sullivan
John Everett

| (Williams, Hambly) Evan Schwabe – GW – 12:16 | 1 – 0 |
| (Anderson) Jesse Unklesbay – 21:14 | 2 – 0 |
| (Peluso, Hardwick) Brett Hammond – 25:36 | 3 – 0 |
| (Schwabe, Hardwick) Junior Lessard – 28:13 | 4 – 0 |
| (Schwabe, Brosz) Junior Lessard – PP – 33:01 | 5 – 0 |

8 min
Penalties
10 min
28
Shots
23

==== Regional Final ====
| March 28, 2004; 1:00 pm | (1) Minnesota | 1–3 (0–1, 0–0, 1–2) | (2) Minnesota-Duluth | Van Andel Arena; Attendance: 3,206 |

Game reference

Kellen Briggs
Goalies
Issac Reichmuth
Referee:
Conrad Hache
Linesmen:
Tim Low
Tom Quinn

| | 0 – 1 | 18:10 – Evan Schwabe (unassisted) |
| | 0 – 2 | 41:37 – GW – Luke Stauffacher (Caig, Peluso) |
| (Guyer, Tallackson) Grant Potulny – PP – 45:25 | 1 – 2 |
| | 1 – 3 | 50:19 – Jesse Unklesbay (unassisted) |

8 min
Penalties
8 min
23
Shots
20

=== Frozen Four – Boston, Massachusetts ===
==== National Semifinals ====
| April 8, 2004; 12:00 pm | (MW2) Minnesota-Duluth | 3–5 (2–0, 1–1, 0–4) | (W2) Denver | FleetCenter; Attendance: 18,084 |

Game reference

Isaac Reichmuth
Goalies
Adam Berkhoel
Referee:
Conrad Hache
Linesmen:
Joe Andrews
Bob Bernard

| (Brosz, Schwabe) Junior Lessard – PP – 01:09 | 1 – 0 |
| (Caig) Tyler Brosz – 04:34 | 2 – 0 |
| | 2 – 1 | 31:40 – Luke Fulghum (Dora, Carle) |
| (Schwabe, Stapleton) Junior Lessard – PP – 35:35 | 3 – 1 |
| | 3 – 2 | 42:30 – Connor James (Skinner, Keith) |
| | 3 – 3 | 43:04 – Ryan Caldwell (Fulghum, Dora) |
| | 3 – 4 | 48:25 – GW – Lukas Dora (Skinner) |
| | 3 – 5 | 59:52 – EN – Greg Keith (James) |

10 min
Penalties
14 min
29
Shots
30

| April 8, 2004; 6:00 pm | (NE1) Boston College | 1–2 (0–1, 1–0, 0–1) | (E1) Maine | FleetCenter; Attendance: 18,138 |

Game reference

Matti Kaltiainen
Goalies
Jimmy Howard
Referee:
Derek Shepherd
Linesmen:
Kile Bergren
Dan Curey

| | 0 – 1 | 19:28 – Jon Jankus (Hamilton, Ryan) |
| (Collins) Ryan Shannon – 22:35 | 1 – 1 |
| | 1 – 2 | 41:05 – GW – Dustin Penner (Hamilton, Lundin) |

8 min
Penalties
16 min
41
Shots
18

==== National Championship ====
| April 10, 2004; 7:00 pm | (E1) Maine | 0–1 (0–1, 0–0, 0–0) | (W2) Denver | FleetCenter; Attendance: 18,597 |

Game reference
| Referee: Tim Kotyra; Linesmen: Scott Whittemore; Tom Cronin |

Scoring summary
| Period | Team | Goal | Assist(s) | Time | Score |
|---|---|---|---|---|---|
| 1st | DEN | Gabe Gauthier (18) – GW PP | James | 12:26 | 1–0 DEN |
| 2nd | None | | | | |
| 3rd | None | | | | |
Penalty summary
| Period | Team | Player | Penalty | Time | PIM |
| 1st | DEN | Max Bull | Checking from behind | 3:39 | 2:00 |
| 1st | DEN | Gabe Gauthier | Roughing | 5:13 | 2:00 |
| 1st | Maine | Dustin Penner | Holding the stick | 5:13 | 2:00 |
| 1st | Maine | Mathew Deschamps | Obstruction – Interference | 11:49 | 2:00 |
| 1st | DEN | Max Bull | Cross-checking | 13:25 | 2:00 |
| 1st | Maine | Jon Jankus | Tripping | 14:24 | 2:00 |
| 1st | DEN | J. D. Corbin | Holding | 17:03 | 2:00 |
| 2nd | Maine | Todd Jackson | Tripping | 26:26 | 2:00 |
| 2nd | DEN | Gabe Gauthier | Cross-checking | 26:31 | 2:00 |
| 2nd | Maine | Jon Jankus | Holding the stick | 26:31 | 2:00 |
| 2nd | DEN | Jeff Drummond | Hooking | 28:16 | 2:00 |
| 2nd | DEN | Ryan Caldwell | Roughing | 29:47 | 2:00 |
| 2nd | Maine | Mike Hamilton | Roughing | 29:47 | 2:00 |
| 3rd | DEN | Jeff Drummond | Obstruction – Holding | 43:24 | 2:00 |
| 3rd | Maine | Prestin Ryan | Interference | 48:09 | 2:00 |
| 3rd | DEN | Jon Foster | Roughing | 52:15 | 2:00 |
| 3rd | Maine | Mathew Deschamps | Roughing | 52:15 | 2:00 |
| 3rd | DEN | Matt Laatsch | Hooking | 57:51 | 2:00 |
| 3rd | DEN | Gabe Gauthier | Delay of game | 58:26 | 2:00 |

Shots by period
| Team | 1 | 2 | 3 | T |
|---|---|---|---|---|
| Denver | 4 | 6 | 10 | 20 |
| Maine | 6 | 9 | 9 | 24 |

Goaltenders
| Team | Name | Saves | Goals against | Time on ice |
|---|---|---|---|---|
| DEN | Adam Berkhoel | 24 | 0 | 60:00 |
| Maine | Jimmy Howard | 19 | 1 | 58:39 |

== All-Tournament team ==
- G: Adam Berkhoel* (Denver)
- D: Ryan Caldwell (Denver)
- D: Prestin Ryan (Maine)
- F: Junior Lessard (Minnesota-Duluth)
- F: Dustin Penner (Maine)
- F: Connor James (Denver)

* Most Outstanding Player(s)

== Record by conference ==
| Conference | # of Bids | Record | Win % | Regional Finals | Frozen Four | Championship Game | Champions |
|---|---|---|---|---|---|---|---|
| WCHA | 5 | 9-4 | .692 | 5 | 2 | 1 | 1 |
| CCHA | 5 | 1-5 | .125 | 1 | - | - | - |
| Hockey East | 3 | 5-3 | .625 | 2 | 2 | 1 | - |
| ECAC | 1 | 0-1 | .000 | - | - | - | - |
| Atlantic Hockey | 1 | 0-1 | .000 | - | - | - | - |
| CHA | 1 | 0-1 | .000 | - | - | - | - |
