= 2004 WCHA men's ice hockey tournament =

2004 WCHA Men's ice hockey tournament
- Dates: March 12–20, 2004
- Teams: 10
- Finals site: Xcel Energy Center; St. Paul, MN
- Champions: Minnesota (13th title)
- Winning coach: Don Lucia (2nd title)
- MVP: Kellen Briggs (Minnesota)
- Attendance: 82,564
- WCHA Men's Ice Hockey Tournaments

The 2004 WCHA Men's Ice Hockey Tournament was the 45th conference playoff in league history and 50th season where a WCHA champion was crowned. The 2004 tournament was played between March 12 and March 20, 2004, at five conference arenas and the Xcel Energy Center in St. Paul, Minnesota. By winning the tournament, Minnesota was awarded the Broadmoor Trophy and received the Western Collegiate Hockey Association's automatic bid to the NCAA Tournament.

== Format ==
The first round of the postseason tournament featured a best-of-three games format. All ten conference schools participated in the tournament with teams seeded No. 1 through No. 10 according to their final conference standing, with a tiebreaker system used to seed teams with an identical number of points accumulated. The top five seeded teams each earned home ice and hosted one of the lower seeded teams.

The winners of the first round series advanced to the Xcel Energy Center for the WCHA Final Five, the collective name for the quarterfinal, semifinal, and championship rounds. The Final Five uses a single-elimination format. Teams were re-seeded No. 1 through No. 5 according to the final regular season conference standings, with the top three teams automatically advancing to the semifinals.

=== Conference standings ===
Note: PTS = Points; GP = Games played; W = Wins; L = Losses; T = Ties; GF = Goals For; GA = Goals Against

2003–04 Western Collegiate Hockey Association standings
	Conference							Overall					
	GP	W	L	T	PTS	GF	GA	GP	W	L	T	GF	GA
#5 North Dakota†	28	20	5	3	43	122	62	41	30	8	3	182	90
#4 Minnesota–Duluth	28	19	7	2	40	119	71	45	28	13	4	185	123
#8 Wisconsin	28	14	7	7	35	85	62	43	22	13	8	123	93
#1 Denver	28	13	10	5	31	93	90	44	27	12	5	149	120
#6 Minnesota*	28	15	12	1	31	101	86	44	27	14	3	178	127
St. Cloud State	28	12	12	4	28	81	89	38	18	16	4	113	118
#15 Colorado College	28	11	15	2	24	77	75	39	20	16	3	126	98
Alaska–Anchorage	28	7	18	3	17	68	103	40	14	23	3	104	140
Minnesota State	28	6	18	4	16	83	139	39	10	24	5	124	179
Michigan Tech	28	6	19	3	15	66	118	38	8	25	5	97	161
Championship: Minnesota † indicates conference regular season champion * indicates conference tournament champion Final rankings: USA Today/American Hockey Magazine Poll Top 15 Poll

== Bracket ==
Teams are reseeded after the first round

First round March 12–14
1	North Dakota	6	4*	—
10	Michigan Tech	2	3	—
2	Minnesota-Duluth	3	6	6
9	Minnesota State	4*	2	5
3	Wisconsin	2	4	1
8	Alaska-Anchorage	3	0	4
4	Denver	3	1	–
7	Colorado College	4	6	–
5	Minnesota	6	7	–
6	St. Cloud State	1	3	–

Quarterfinal; March 18
7	Colorado College	1
8	Alaska-Anchorage	4

Semifinals; March 19
1	North Dakota	4
8	Alaska-Anchorage	2
2	Minnesota-Duluth	4
5	Minnesota	7

Championship; March 20
1	North Dakota	4
5	Minnesota	5

Note: * denotes overtime period(s)

=== First round ===
==== (1) North Dakota vs. (10) Michigan Tech ====
March 12	North Dakota	6 – 2	Michigan Tech	Ralph Engelstad Arena	Recap
(Stafford, Schneider) Zach Parise - 03:27		First period	08:39 - Clay Wilson
(Bochenski, Parise) Brady Murray - PP - 01:28 (Parise, Stafford) Nick Fuher - GW - 16:41		Second period	No scoring
(Parise, Murray) Drew Stafford - 00:26 (McMahon) Quinn Fylling - 01:44 (Lundbohm, Fuher) Colby Genoway - 07:25		Third period	05:14 - Justin Brown (Markham, Radovich)
( 13 saves / 15 shots ) Jake Brandt		Goalie stats	Cam Ellsworth ( 20 saves / 25 shots ) / Bryce Luker ( 7 saves / 8 shots )

March 13	North Dakota	4 – 3	OT	Michigan Tech	Ralph Engelstad Arena	Recap
(Jones, Parise) Brnadon Bochenski - PP - 14:22		First period		11:21 - PP - Colin Murphy (Dora, Engelhardt); 19:00 - PP - Brandon Schwartz (Pittis)
No scoring		Second period		13:34 - Brett Engelhardt (Schwartz)
(Bochenski, Murray) Zach Parise - 05:39 (Fuher) Chris Porter - 08:53		Third period		No scoring
( 23 saves / 26 shots ) Jake Brandt		Goalie stats		Cam Ellsworth ( 42 saves / 46 shots )

North Dakota won series 2–0

==== (2) Minnesota-Duluth vs. (9) Minnesota State-Mankato ====
March 12	Minnesota-Duluth	3 – 4	OT	Minnesota State-Mankato	Duluth Entertainment Convention Center	Recap
(Stapleton, Geisler) Luke Stauffacher - 06:02		First period		10:06 - Chad Clower (Metcalf)
(Peluso, Geisler) Junior Lessard - PP - 07:36 (Geisler, Smith) Justin Williams - 19:56		Second period		01:25 - PP - David Backes (Johns, Clower); 06:34 - Chad Clower (Forsythe, Morin)
No scoring		Third period		No scoring
No scoring		First overtime period		12:18 - GW - Lucas Fransen (Forscythe, Joseph)
( 34 saves / 38 shots ) Isaac Reichmuth		Goalie stats		Jon Volp ( 46 saves / 49 shots )

March 13	Minnesota-Duluth	6 – 2	Minnesota State-Mankato	Duluth Entertainment Convention Center	Recap
No Scoring		First period	No scoring
(Unklesbay, Caig) Beau Geisler - 04:31 (Schwabe) Junior Lessard - 05:43 (Geisler, Schwabe) Junior Lessard - GW PP - 07:06 (Lessard, Geisler) Luke Stauffacher - 14:21		Second period	01:54 - Brock Becker (Rankin); 18:03 - Shane Joseph (Clower, Backes)
(Schwabe, Stapleton) Junior Lessard - PP - 06:04 (Lessard) Justin Williams - 14:21		Third period	No scoring
( 26 saves / 28 shots ) Isaac Reichmuth		Goalie stats	Jon Volp ( 38 saves / 44 shots ) / Kyle Nixon ( 5 saves / 5 shots )

March 14	Minnesota-Duluth	6 – 5	Minnesota State-Mankato	Duluth Entertainment Convention Center	Recap
(Schwabe, Lessard) Marco Peluso - PP - 01:23 (Geisler, Smith) T. J. Caig - 02:33 (Hammond) John Miskovich - 04:53 (Peluso, Schwabe) Tim Stapleton - PP - 07:21; Marco Peluso - 10:32		First period	14:24 - SH - David Backes (Joseph)
(Peluso, Geisler) Evan Schwabe - GW PP - 06:35		Second period	01:48 - PP - Rob Rankin (Morin, Peto); 11:44 - PP - Brock Becker (Morin, Peto); 19:48 - Lucas Fransen (Kisio, Thompson)
No scoring		Third period	15:38 - Shane Joseph (McKelvie, Peto)
( 26 saves / 28 shots ) Isaac Reichmuth		Goalie stats	Jon Volp ( 11 saves / 15 shots ) / Kyle Nixon ( 26 saves / 28 shots )

Minnesota-Duluth won series 2–1

==== (3) Wisconsin vs. (8) Alaska-Anchorage ====
March 12	Wisconsin	2 – 3	Alaska-Anchorage	Kohl Center	Recap
(Earl, Likens) Jake Dowell - PP - 02:51		First period	09:01 - PP - Dallas Steward (Segal, Bourne); 18:54 - PP - Charlie Kronschnabel (Fournier, King)
(Gilbert, Suter) Ross Carlson - PP - 05:14		Second period	No scoring
No scoring		Third period	05:56 - GW PP - Justin Johnson (Fournier, Glencross)
( 21 saves / 24 shots ) Bernd Brückler		Goalie stats	Chris King ( 45 saves / 47 shots )

March 13	Wisconsin	4 – 0	Alaska-Anchorage	Kohl Center	Recap
Rene Bourque - GW - 02:00		First period	No scoring
(Earl, Dowell) A.J. Degenhardt - 02:39 (Bourque, Joudrey) Ryan MacMurchy - 03:24 (Burish) A.J. Degenhardt - 14:30		Second period	No scoring
No scoring		Third period	No scoring
( 16 saves / 16 shots ) Bernd Brückler		Goalie stats	Kevin Reiter ( 41 saves / 45 shots )

March 14	Wisconsin	1 – 4	Alaska-Anchorage	Kohl Center	Recap
No Scoring		First period	10:42 - Chris Fournier (Segal)
No scoring		Second period	08:38 - GW - Chris Fournier; 12:33 - PP - Curtis Glencross (Fournier, Smith); 18:30 - Curtis Glencross
(MacMurchy, Boeser) Andrew Joudrey - PP - 13:05		Third period	No scoring
( 19 saves / 23 shots ) Bernd Brückler		Goalie stats	Chris King ( 29 saves / 30 shots )

Alaska-Anchorage won series 2–1

==== (4) Denver vs. (7) Colorado College ====
March 12	Denver	3 – 4	Colorado College	Magness Arena	Recap
(Handza, Halme) Ted O'Leary - 10:02		First period	04:07 - Marty Sertich (Canzanello, Zaba)
(Corbin, Skinner) Gabe Gauthier - 13:38		Second period	No scoring
(Carle, Keith) Lukas Dora - PP - 13:53		Third period	07:22 - Andrew Canzanello (Cox, Slattengren); 09:57 - Trevor Frischmon (Stuart, Canzanello); 11:48 - GW - Aaron Slattengren (Petiot, Cox)
( 22 saves / 26 shots ) Adam Berkhoel		Goalie stats	Matt Zaba ( 18 saves / 21 shots )

March 13	Denver	1 – 6	Colorado College	Magness Arena	Recap
No Scoring		First period	11:43 - Colin Stuart (Polaski, Sweatt); 15:27 - GW - Brett Sterling (Petoit, Liebel); 18:24 - Reid Goolsby (Slattengren, Crabb)
(Carle, Skinner) Gabe Gauthier - PP - 05:00		Second period	08:20 - PP - Brady Greco (Canzanello, Sertich); 17:46 - PP - Brady Greco (Stuart, Sertich)
No scoring		Third period	06:50 - PP - Brett Sterling (Canzanello, Crabb)
( 10 saves / 13 shots ) Adam Berkhoel / ( 13 saves / 16 shots ) Glenn Fisher		Goalie stats	Curtis McElhinney ( 35 saves / 36 shots )

Colorado College won series 2–0

==== (5) Minnesota vs. (6) St. Cloud State ====
March 12	Minnesota	6 – 1	St. Cloud State	Mariucci Arena	Recap
(Fleming) Mike Vannelli - 10:02 (Riddle, Vanek) Matt Koalska - GW PP - 14:58		First period	12:30 - Brock Hooton (Szabo, Jensen)
(Martin, Riddle) Thomas Vanek - 06:18 (Vanek, Kennedy) Ryan Potulny - 09:44 (Vannelli) Troy Riddle - 14:44		Second period	No scoring
(Riddle, Ballard) Ryan Potulny - PP - 15:21		Third period	No scoring
( 26 saves / 27 shots ) Kellen Briggs		Goalie stats	Aaron Coole ( 14 saves / 18 shots ) / Tim Boron ( 19 saves / 21 shots )

March 13	Minnesota	7 – 3	St. Cloud State	Mariucci Arena	Recap
(Ballard, Riddle) Ryan Potulny - PP - 19:46		First period	No scoring
(Riddle) Ryan Potulny - 12:52 (Potulny, Ballard) Troy Riddle - PP - 19:14		Second period	00:22 - Brock Hooton (Szabo)
(Vanek, Koalska) Troy Riddle - GW PP - 01:39 (Tallackson, Guyer) Grant Potulny - PP - 07:16 (Vanek, Vannelli) Troy Riddle - 08:38 (Potulny, Tallackson) Tyler Hirsch - 09:13		Third period	00:24 - SH - Matt Hendricks (Reeder); 09:33 - Konrad Reeder (Peters, Doyle)
( 23 saves / 26 shots ) Kellen Briggs		Goalie stats	Tim Boron ( 39 saves / 46 shots )

Minnesota won series 2–0

=== Quarterfinal ===
==== (7) Colorado College vs. (8) Alaska-Anchorage ====
March 18	Colorado College	1 – 4	Alaska-Anchorage	Xcel Energy Center	Recap
No Scoring		First period	No scoring
(Sterling, Polaski) Trevor Frischmon - 09:21		Second period	09:51 - Brandon Segal (Anderson, Arcand-Kootenay); 10:41 - GW - Vladimir Novak (Johnson, Gilchrist); 19:24 - Brant McMann (Novak)
No scoring		Third period	19:43 - EN - Dallas Steward (Kronschnabel, Green)
( 7 saves / 9 shots ) Matt Zaba / ( 7 saves / 8 shots ) Curtis McElhinney		Goalie stats	Chris King ( 44 saves / 45 shots )

=== Semifinals ===
==== (1) North Dakota vs. (8) Alaska-Anchorage ====
March 19	North Dakota	4 – 2	Alaska-Anchorage	Xcel Energy Center	Recap
(Parise, Bochenski) Brady Murray - 15:56		First period	No scoring
(Hale, Prpich) Rory McMahon - 02:16 (Bochenski, Murray) Zach Parise - GW - 09:01 (Jones, McMahon) Ryan Hale - 15:50		Second period	10:30 - PP - Curtis Glencross (Bourne, Segal)
No scoring		Third period	17:18 - Lee Green
( 22 saves / 24 shots ) Jordan Parise		Goalie stats	Chris King ( 41 saves / 45 shots )

==== (2) Minnesota-Duluth vs. (5) Minnesota ====
March 19	Minnesota-Duluth	4 – 7	Minnesota	Xcel Energy Center	Recap
(Stapleton, Peluso) Luke Stauffacher - 02:08 (Unklesbay, Geisler) Evan Schwabe - 09:06 (Williams, Lessard) Evan Schwabe - 14:21		First period	14:03 - PP - Troy Riddle (Potulny, Koalska); 19:25 - Danny Irmen (Guyer, Fleming)
No scoring		Second period	04:51 - SH - Danny Irmen (Ballard); 14:25 - Ryan Potulny
(Schwabe, Lessard) Justin Williams - 00:40		Third period	03:45 - GW - Thomas Vanek (Riddle, Koalska); 14:41 - Andy Sertich (Waibel, Vannelli); 19:24 - Barry Tallackson (Waibel, Fleming)
( 34 saves / 40 shots ) Isaac Reichmuth		Goalie stats	Kellen Briggs ( 27 saves / 31 shots )

=== Third place ===
==== (2) Minnesota-Duluth vs. (8) Alaska-Anchorage ====
March 20	Minnesota-Duluth	4 – 2	Alaska-Anchorage	Xcel Energy Center	Recap
No Scoring		First period	12:14 - Curtis Glencross (Arcand-Kootenay, Reiter)
(Peluso, Lessard) Evan Schwabe - PP - 09:30 (Geisler, Peluso) Junior Lessard - PP - 13:12 (Hammond, Czech) Luke Stauffacher - GW SH - 19:14		Second period	No scoring
(Miskovich) Bryan McGregor - 10:13		Third period	19:42 - Vladimir Novak (Smith, Johnson)
( 25 saves / 27 shots ) Josh Johnson		Goalie stats	Kevin Reiter ( 36 saves / 40 shots )

=== Championship ===
==== (1) North Dakota vs. (5) Minnesota ====
March 20	North Dakota	4 – 5	Minnesota	Xcel Energy Center	Recap
(Parise) Drew Stafford - PP - 16:57		First period	10:39 - Danny Irmen (Guyer, Harrington)
(Parise, Schneider) Brandon Bochenski - 08:50 (Fuher, Bochenski) Zach Parise - 16:47		Second period	04:09 - Jon Waibel (Kennedy)
(Parise, Smaby) Brandon Bochenski - SH - 09:18		Third period	02:08 - Thomas Vanek; 04:48 - Troy Riddle (Harrington, Koalska); 13:58 - GW - Grant Potulny (Irmen)
( 33 saves / 38 shots ) Jake Brandt		Goalie stats	Kellen Briggs ( 35 saves / 39 shots )

== Tournament awards ==
=== All-Tournament Team ===
- F Zach Parise (North Dakota)
- F Danny Irmen (Minnesota)
- F Brandon Bochenski (North Dakota)
- D Matt Jones (North Dakota)
- D Keith Ballard (Minnesota)
- G Kellen Briggs* (Minnesota)

* Most Valuable Player(s)

== See also ==
- Western Collegiate Hockey Association men's champions
