= Josh Engel =

American ice hockey player (born 1984)

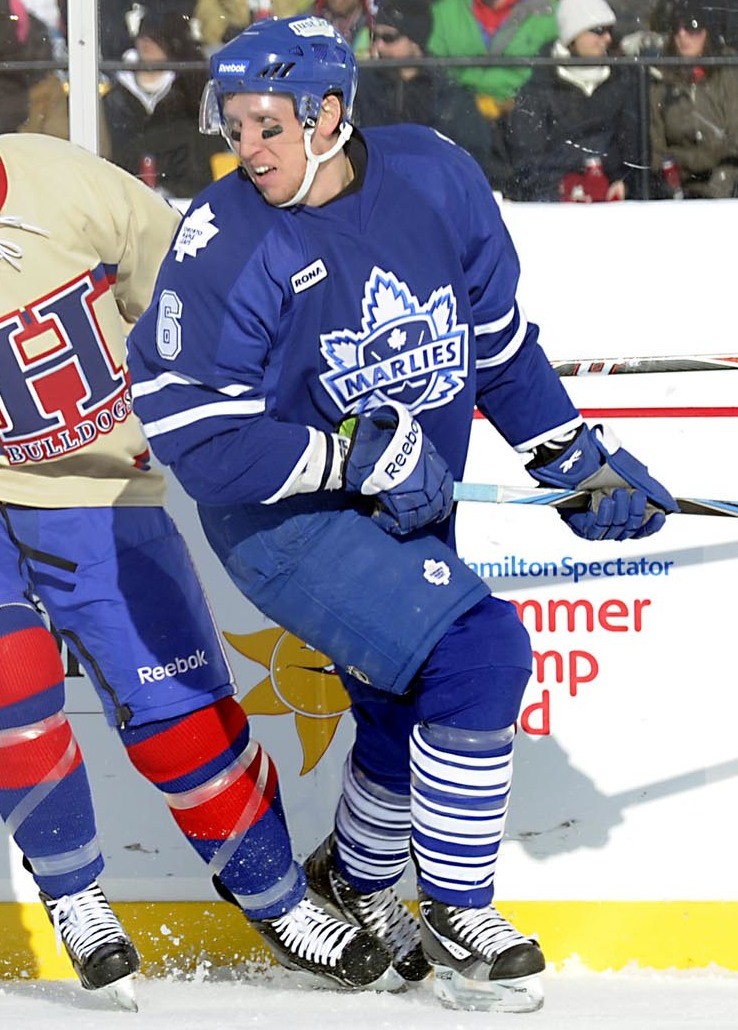
- Engel with the Toronto Marlies in 2012
- Born: July 7, 1984 (age 40); Rice Lake, Wisconsin, U.S.
- Height: 6 ft 3 in (191 cm)
- Weight: 206 lb (93 kg; 14 st 10 lb)
- Position: Defense
- Shot: Left
- Played for: Albany River Rats; Providence Bruins; Toronto Marlies
- NHL draft: Undrafted
- Playing career: 2007–2012

Josh Engel (born July 7, 1984) is an American former professional ice hockey defenseman.

== Playing career ==
Engel primarily played for the Toronto Marlies in the American Hockey League (AHL). He played collegiate hockey with the University of Wisconsin culminating in a National Championship in the 2005–06 season.

== Career statistics ==
			Regular season					Playoffs
Season	Team	League	GP	G	A	Pts	PIM	GP	G	A	Pts	PIM
2003–04	Green Bay Gamblers	USHL	60	4	12	16	42	—	—	—	—	—
2004–05	University of Wisconsin	NCAA	18	0	2	2	10	—	—	—	—	—
2005–06	University of Wisconsin	NCAA	17	0	3	3	6	—	—	—	—	—
2006–07	University of Wisconsin	NCAA	30	0	4	4	14	—	—	—	—	—
2007–08	University of Wisconsin	NCAA	35	3	5	8	18	—	—	—	—	—
2007–08	Albany River Rats	AHL	3	0	1	1	0	1	0	0	0	0
2008–09	Gwinnett Gladiators	ECHL	36	2	12	14	16	1	0	0	0	0
2008–09	Providence Bruins	AHL	4	0	0	0	2	—	—	—	—	—
2008–09	Toronto Marlies	AHL	28	1	4	5	20	3	0	1	1	0
2009–10	Toronto Marlies	AHL	70	4	13	17	18	—	—	—	—	—
2010–11	Reading Royals	ECHL	2	1	0	1	0	—	—	—	—	—
2010–11	Toronto Marlies	AHL	70	11	8	19	14	—	—	—	—	—
2011–12	Toronto Marlies	AHL	66	3	7	10	18	6	0	0	0	0
AHL totals			241	19	33	52	72	10	0	1	1	0
