= Matt Jones (ice hockey) =

American ice hockey player (born 1983)

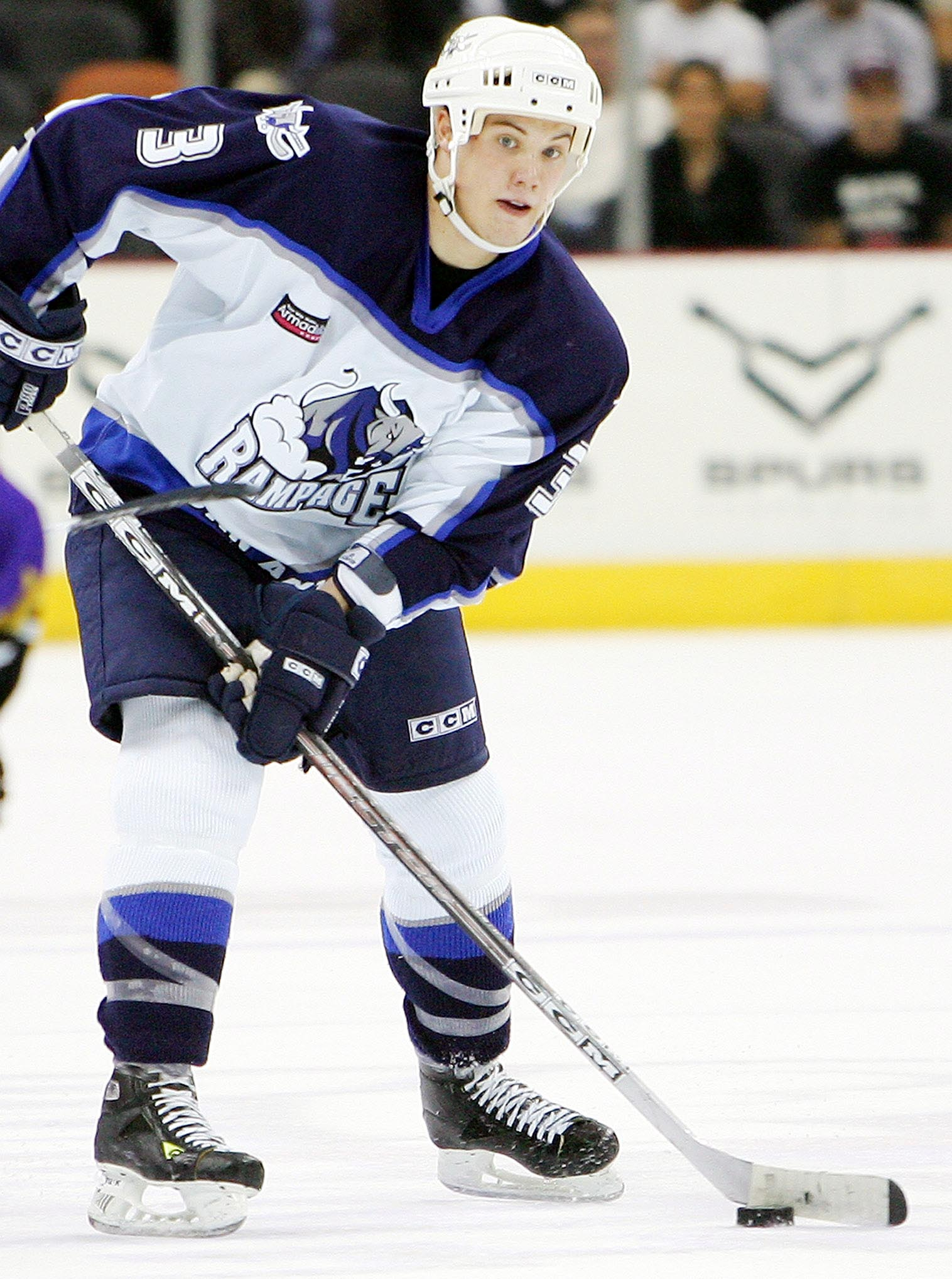
- Jones with the San Antonio Rampage in 2005
- Born: August 8, 1983 (age 43) Downers Grove, Illinois, U.S.
- Height: 6 ft 0 in (183 cm)
- Weight: 215 lb (98 kg; 15 st 5 lb)
- Position: Defense
- Shot: Left
- Played for: Phoenix Coyotes
- National team: United States
- NHL draft: 80th overall, 2002; Phoenix Coyotes
- Playing career: 2005–2009

Matt S. Jones (born August 8, 1983) is an American former professional ice hockey defenseman who played in the National Hockey League (NHL) for the Phoenix Coyotes.

== Playing career ==
Jones was selected 80th overall in the 2002 NHL entry draft by the Phoenix Coyotes. He played four seasons at the University of North Dakota and helped lead his team to the 2005 NCAA Frozen Four championship game as an assistant captain.

Jones made his professional debut in the 2005–06 season with the San Antonio Rampage of the American Hockey League (AHL). Jones made his National Hockey League (NHL) debut in the same year, playing in 16 games with the Coyotes.

On March 3, 2010, Jones was traded to the Toronto Maple Leafs, along with a 4th-round pick and a 7th-round pick in the 2010 NHL entry draft for Lee Stempniak. On April 27, 2010, it was revealed that Jones was still recovering from a concussion and was not medically cleared to play.

== Career statistics ==
=== Regular season and playoffs ===
			Regular season					Playoffs
Season	Team	League	GP	G	A	Pts	PIM	GP	G	A	Pts	PIM
1999–2000	Green Bay Gamblers	USHL	54	1	4	5	59	13	0	0	0	2
2000–01	Green Bay Gamblers	USHL	52	3	10	13	58	4	0	0	0	2
2001–02	University of North Dakota	WCHA	37	2	5	7	20	—	—	—	—	—
2002–03	University of North Dakota	WCHA	39	1	6	7	26	—	—	—	—	—
2003–04	University of North Dakota	WCHA	41	7	14	21	40	—	—	—	—	—
2004–05	University of North Dakota	WCHA	43	6	10	16	66	—	—	—	—	—
2005–06	San Antonio Rampage	AHL	59	2	11	13	46	—	—	—	—	—
2005–06	Phoenix Coyotes	NHL	16	0	2	2	14	—	—	—	—	—
2006–07	San Antonio Rampage	AHL	24	0	2	2	23	—	—	—	—	—
2006–07	Phoenix Coyotes	NHL	45	1	6	7	39	—	—	—	—	—
2007–08	Phoenix Coyotes	NHL	45	0	2	2	10	—	—	—	—	—
2007–08	San Antonio Rampage	AHL	5	0	0	0	0	—	—	—	—	—
2008–09	San Antonio Rampage	AHL	58	2	4	6	40	—	—	—	—	—
AHL totals			146	4	17	21	109	—	—	—	—	—
NHL totals			106	1	10	11	63	—	—	—	—	—

=== International ===
Year	Team	Event	Result	GP	G	A	Pts	PIM
2003	United States	WJC	4th	7	0	3	3	6
Junior totals				7	0	3	3	6

== Awards and honors ==
Award	Year
All-WCHA Second Team	2003–04
WCHA All-Tournament Team	2004
All-WCHA Third Team	2004–05
