= Green Bay Gamblers =

American junior ice hockey team

- City: Green Bay, Wisconsin
- League: USHL
- Conference: Eastern
- Founded: 1994
- Home arena: Resch Center
- Colors: Black, yellow, white
- Owner: PMI Entertainment Group
- General manager: Patrick McCadden
- Head coach: Patrick McCadden

Franchise history
- 1994–present: Green Bay Gamblers

Championships
- Regular season titles: 5 Anderson Cups (1995–96, 1996–97, 2008–09, 2009–10, and 2011–12)
- Playoff championships: 4 Clark Cups (1996, 2000, 2010, and 2012)

The Green Bay Gamblers are a junior ice hockey team in the Eastern Conference of the United States Hockey League (USHL). They play in Green Bay, Wisconsin, at the Resch Center.

== History ==
=== Professional hockey in Green Bay ===
The first professional hockey team to be based in Green Bay was the Green Bay Bobcats who started playing in 1958 when the Brown County Veterans Memorial Arena was built. There is some confusion over what league the team played in during its early years or if the team played in multiple leagues. Some sources cite that the Bobcats played in the U.S. Central Hockey League, a predecessor to the current United States Hockey League (USHL). Other sources claim that the Bobcats did not start playing in the USCHL until 1961. The Green Bay Bobcats franchise folded after the 1980-1981 season and 23 years of play. However, since the 2008-2009 season, the Green Bay Gamblers have used a yellow bobcat prominently in the team's logo as well as having a bobcat by the name of "Ace" as the team's mascot.

=== Green Bay Gamblers ===
Since their inception into the United States Hockey League in 1994, the Green Bay Gamblers have been one of the premiere junior "A" hockey franchises in all of North America. To their credit the Gamblers have won two Junior A, Tier 2 National Championships (Gold Cups in 1996 and 1997), five Anderson Cups (1996, 1997, 2009, 2010, and 2012), four Clark Cups (1996, 2000, 2010, and 2012), four USHL Eastern Division titles, and one USHL Northern Division title. Since the USHL became Tier 1 in 2002, the Clark Cup also represents that level's national championship.

== Home rinks ==
From when the Gamblers entered the league at the start of the 1994-1995 season through the 2001-2002 season, the team's primary venue was at the Brown County Veterans Memorial Arena. For the start of the 2002-2003 season, the Gamblers moved into the Resch Center, an 8,800 seat arena which was built on the opposite side of Shopko Hall. The team played at the Memorial Arena a few times each season due to scheduling conflicts with the Resch Center until the arena was scheduled for demolition in 2019.

During the years at the Arena, other venues were sometimes used due to scheduling conflicts. These include the De Pere Ice & Recreation Center, the Brown County Youth Hockey Arena, the Cornerstone Community Center, Fond du Lac's Blue Line Ice Center, Beaver Dam Ice Arena, Greenheck Ice Center in Schofield.

Since 1994 the average attendance of a Gamblers Game is 3,353 people, which is among the top in the USHL. In 2010, the Green Bay Gamblers set a USHL record for the highest attended playoff game when 8,487 fans showed up to see game five of the USHL Playoff championship, a game the Gamblers won resulting in franchise's third Clark Cup. The record has since been broken multiple times.

== Season-by-season record ==
Note: GP = Games played, W = Wins, L = Losses, T = Ties, OTL = Overtime losses, Pts = Points, GF = Goals for, GA = Goals against, PIM = Penalties in minutes

Season	GP	W	L	T	OTL	SOL	PTS	GF	GA	PIM	Finish	Playoffs
1994–95	48	9	34	1	4	0	23	147	264	—	11th of 11	Did not qualify
1995–96	46	32	11	3	0	0	67	219	137	—	1st of 11	Won Clark Cup
1996–97	54	41	11	0	2	0	84	260	187	1882	1st of 6, North	Won quarterfinals, 4–2 vs. Fargo-Moorhead Ice Sharks; Won semifinals, 4–3 vs. North Iowa Huskies; Lost championship, 0-4 vs. Lincoln Stars
1997–98	56	31	20	0	0	5	51	157	183	1576	3rd of 6, North	Lost quarterfinals, 0-4 vs. Des Moines Buccaneers
1998–99	56	41	11	0	4	0	86	213	143	1568	1st of 4, East	Won quarterfinals, 3–0 vs. Thunder Bay Flyers; Lost semifinals, 0-3 vs. Omaha Lancers
1999–00	58	35	18	0	0	5	75	232	174	1318	2nd of 7, East	Won quarterfinals, 3–1 vs. Waterloo Black Hawks; Won semifinals, 3–2 vs. Des Moines Buccaneers; Won championship, 4–1 vs. Twin City Vulcans
2000–01	56	32	13	0	11	0	75	177	153	994	1st of 6, East	Lost quarterfinals, 1-3 vs. Tri-City Storm
2001–02	61	35	20	0	6	0	76	184	179	1257	1st of 6, East	Won quarterfinals, 3–0 vs. Des Moines Buccaneers; Lost semifinals, 1-3 vs. Sioux City Musketeers
2002–03	60	16	36	—	3	5	40	139	215	1341	5th of 5, East	Did not qualify
2003–04	60	27	28	—	4	1	59	171	176	1144	5th of 6, East	Did not qualify
2004–05	60	21	37	—	2	0	44	141	220	971	5th of 6, East	Did not qualify
2005–06	60	30	26	—	1	3	64	182	183	1127	3rd of 6, East	Lost quarterfinals, 0-3 vs. Des Moines Buccaneers
2006–07	60	24	30	—	1	5	54	176	198	1317	4th of 6, East	Lost first round, 0-4 vs. Indiana Ice
2007–08	60	13	41	—	2	4	32	130	224	1346	6th of 6, East	Did not qualify
2008–09	60	39	17	—	0	4	82	237	165	1363	1st of 6, East	Won quarterfinals, 3–0 vs. Waterloo Black Hawks; Lost semifinals, 1-3 vs. Indiana Ice
2009–10	60	45	10	—	2	3	95	212	140	1394	1st of 8, East	Won quarterfinals, 3–0 vs. Waterloo Black Hawks; Won semifinals, 3–1 vs. Indiana Ice; Won championship, 3–2 vs. Fargo Force
2010–11	60	41	15	—	2	2	86	189	131	790	2nd of 8, Eastern	Won quarterfinals, 3–0 vs. Indiana Ice; Won semifinals, 3–1 vs. Cedar Rapids RoughRiders; Lost championship, 1-3 vs. Dubuque Fighting Saints
2011–12	60	47	9	—	2	2	98	250	138	882	1st of 8, Eastern	Won quarterfinals, 3–1 vs. Youngstown Phantoms; Won semifinals, 3–0 vs. Indiana Ice; Won championship, 3–2 vs. Waterloo Black Hawks
2012–13	64	37	23	—	3	1	78	234	207	1069	2nd of 8, Eastern	Lost quarterfinals, 1-3 vs. Youngstown Phantoms
2013–14	60	30	24	—	3	3	66	183	176	887	4th of 8, Eastern	Lost quarterfinals, 1-3 vs. Indiana Ice
2014–15	60	18	34	—	3	5	44	156	213	1010	9th of 9, Eastern	Did not qualify
2015–16	60	37	16	—	4	3	81	191	135	881	2nd of 9, Eastern	Lost quarterfinals, 1-3 vs. Dubuque Fighting Saints
2016–17	60	34	22	—	2	2	72	173	145	—	5th of 9, Eastern	Did not qualify
2017–18	60	30	24	—	4	2	66	172	170	—	3rd of 9, Eastern	Lost quarterfinals, 0-2 vs. Dubuque Fighting Saints
2018–19	62	19	34	—	6	3	47	173	250	967	8th of 9, Eastern	Did not qualify
2019–20	48	24	19	—	2	3	53	168	147	840	3rd of 8, Eastern	Season cancelled
2020–21	51	30	17	—	2	2	64	190	182	821	3rd of 6, Eastern	Lost conference semifinals, 0–2 vs. Muskegon Lumberjacks
2021–22	62	23	34	—	3	2	51	195	266	837	8th of 8, Eastern	Did not qualify
2022–23	62	32	23	—	3	4	71	204	204	829	4th of 8, Eastern	Lost quarterfinals, 1–2 vs. Dubuque Fighting Saints
2023–24	62	34	18	—	7	3	78	233	214	1046	3rd of 8, Eastern	Won quarterfinals, 2-1 vs. Chicago Steel; Lost conference semifinals, 2–3 vs. Muskegon Lumberjacks
2024–25	62	27	31	—	2	2	58	202	242	1119	6th of 8, Eastern	Lost quarterfinals, 0–2 vs. Madison Capitols
2025–26	62	38	18	—	4	2	82	234	185	1281	3rd of 8, Eastern	Lost quarterfinals, 0–2 vs. Madison Capitols
Totals	1808	934	706	4	90	74	2020	5890	5761	30576		

== Players ==
=== Team captains ===
- Ryan Petersen (2004–05)
- Ryan Little (2007–08)
- Patrick McCadden (2009-10)
- Max Hartner (2011–12)
- Grant Arnold (2011–12)
- Ryan Lough (2013–14)
- Sam Saliba (2015–16)
- Jared Spooner (2016–17)
- Jackson Charlesworth (2017–18)
- Nick Leitner (2018–19)
- McKade Webster (2019–20)
- Jesse Tucker (2020–21)
- Jarod Crespo (2021–22)
- Jabob Martin (2022–23)
- Michael DeAngelo (2023–24)
- Brady O'Malley (2024–25)
- Brady O'Malley and Elliot Gulley (2025–26)

=== Notable alumni ===
==== NHL ====
On March 25, 2013, former Gamblers head coach Jon Cooper was named the head coach of the Tampa Bay Lightning. He is the first USHL coaching alumnus to lead an NHL team. Former Gamblers head coach Derek Lalonde was hired by the Lightning as an assistant coach on July 12, 2018, joining Cooper's staff.

On June 30, 2022, the Detroit Red Wings hired Derek Lalonde as head coach.

- Sean Backman
- Stu Bickel
- Justin Braun
- Alex Brooks
- Adam Burish
- Ryan Carter
- Ty Conklin
- Joey Crabb
- Austin Czarnik
- Sheldon Dries
- Jeff Finger
- Michael Forney
- Matt Greene
- Ryan Greene
- Eric Gryba
- Nate Guenin
- Adam Huska
- Matt Jones
- Anders Lee
- Brendan Lemieux
- Artyom Levshunov
- Mason Lohrei
- Connor Mackey
- Dakota Mermis
- Casey Mittelstadt
- Wes O'Neill
- Gustav Olofsson
- Victor Oreskovich
- Tom Preissing
- Vili Saarijärvi
- Jordan Schmaltz
- Nick Schmaltz
- Mike Sislo
- Tim Stapleton
- Andy Welinski
- Blake Wheeler
- Christian Wolanin

=== Notable NHL draft picks ===
Green Bay Gamblers have had the following players selected in the NHL draft.

Year	Player	Drafted team	Pick
1999	Jeff Finger	Colorado Avalanche	8th round
2002	Matt Greene	Edmonton Oilers	2nd round
2002	Matt Jones	Phoenix Coyotes	3rd round
2002	Nate Guenin	New York Rangers	4th round
2002	Joey Crabb	New York Rangers	7th round
2002	Adam Burish	Chicago Blackhawks	9th round
2004	Blake Wheeler	Phoenix Coyotes	1st round
2004	Victor Oreskovich	Colorado Avalanche	2nd round
2004	Wes O'Neill	New York Islanders	4th round
2006	Michael Forney	Atlanta Thrashers	3rd round
2006	Eric Gryba	Ottawa Senators	3rd round
2007	Justin Braun	San Jose Sharks	7th round
2009	Nick Jensen	Phoenix Coyotes	5th round
2009	Anders Lee	New York Islanders	7th round
2011	Andy Welinski	Anaheim Ducks	3rd round
2012	Jordan Schmaltz	St. Louis Blues	1st round
2013	Gustav Olofsson	Minnesota Wild	2nd round
2014	Nick Schmaltz	Chicago Blackhawks	1st round
2014	Brendan Lemieux	Buffalo Sabres	2nd round
2015	Vili Saarijärvi	Detroit Red Wings	3rd round
2015	Christian Wolanin	Ottawa Senators	4th round
2015	Adam Húska	New York Rangers	7th round
2016	Andrew Peeke	Columbus Blue Jackets	2nd round
2016	Rhett Gardner	Dallas Stars	4th round
2017	Casey Mittelstadt	Buffalo Sabres	1st round
2018	John Leonard	San Jose Sharks	6th round
2020	Mason Lohrei	Boston Bruins	2nd round
2024	Artyom Levshunov	Chicago Blackhawks	1st round

=== Olympics ===
Year	Player	Country	Finish
2006	Māris Ziediņš	Latvia	12th
2014	Blake Wheeler	United States	4th
2022	Markus Lauridsen	Denmark	7th

=== NCAA champions ===
Gamblers alumni have played on multiple NCAA men's hockey national champions teams:

Year	Player	School	Division
2006	Adam Burish	Wisconsin	Division I
2006	Josh Engel	Wisconsin	Division I
2006	Kyle Klubertanz	Wisconsin	Division I
2009	Eric Gryba	Boston	Division I
2016	Christian Wolanin	North Dakota	Division I
2016	Nick Schmaltz	North Dakota	Division I
2022	David Carle (Note: Gamblers assistant coach, Denver head coach)	Denver	Division I

=== Statistical leaders ===
Points
Player	Pos	GP	G	A	Pts	P/G
Chad Stauffacher	F	135	73	67	140	1.04
Kyle Novak	RW	126	44	84	128	1.02
Nick Schmaltz	C	130	37	82	119	0.92
Billy Pugliese	F	91	54	62	116	1.27
Luke Stauffacher	RW	189	39	77	116	0.61
Matthew Weis	C	141	42	70	112	0.79
Reed Seckel	C/LW	114	35	75	110	0.96
Nick Schilkey	RW	118	48	59	107	0.91
Alex Broadhurst	C	108	39	67	106	0.98
Kevin Granato	C	98	45	57	102	1.04

Goals
Player	Pos	G
Chad Stauffacher	F	73
Billy Pugliese	F	54
Sergio Somma	LW	52
C.J. Lee	F	50
Nick Schilkey	RW	48
Alex Kile	LW	47
Kevin Granato	C	45
Nolan LaPorte	RW	45
Kyle Novak	RW	44
Matt Johnson	RW	43

Assists
Player	Pos	A
Kyle Novak	RW	84
Nick Schmaltz	C	82
Luke Stauffacher	RW	77
Reed Seckel	C/LW	75
Jeff Finger	D	72
Matthew Weis	C	70
Dan Calzada	D	68
Chad Stauffacher	F	67
Alex Broadhurst	C	67
Billy Pugliese	F	62

Points per game
Player	Pos	P/G
John Eichelberger	C	1.408
Aaron Smith	F	1.364
Ryan Forbes	F	1.277
Billy Pugliese	F	1.275
Casey Mittelstadt	C/LW	1.250
Jason Cupp	C	1.241
Mario LeBlanc	F	1.200
Anders Lee	LW	1.119
Brian McDonald	LW	1.053
Chris Line	RW	1.050

Games played
Player	Pos	GP
Luke Stauffacher	RW	189
Dallas Steward	F	164
Corey Couturier	LW	164
Dan Calzada	D	162
Jeff Finger	D	161
Anthony Hayes	F	160
Ryan Little	F/D	155
C.J. Lee	F	152
Brandon Longley	D	148
Matthew Weis	C	141

== Head coaches ==
- Don Granato (1994–97)
- Mark Osiecki (1997–2004)
- Mark Mazzoleni (2004-2008)
- Dave Insalaco (2008) (interim)
- Jon Cooper (2008–2010)
- Eric Rud (2010–11)
- Derek Lalonde (2011–2014)
- Pat Mikesch (2014–2022)
- Michael Leone (2022–2024)
- Patrick McCadden (2024–present)
