= Ryan Caldwell (ice hockey) =

Canadian ice hockey defenceman

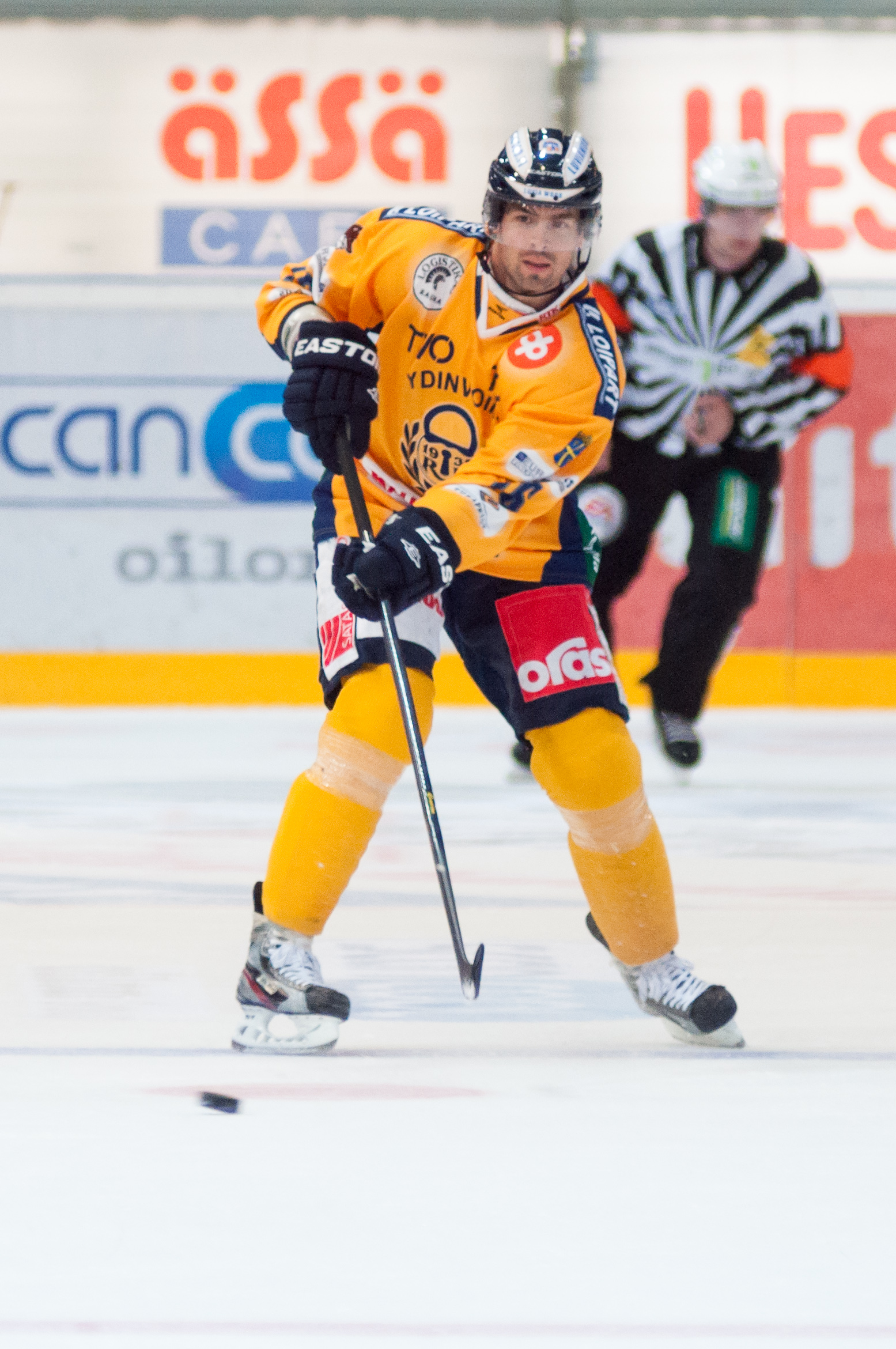
- Born: June 15, 1981 (age 44) Brandon, Manitoba, Canada
- Height: 6 ft 3 in (191 cm)
- Weight: 202 lb (92 kg; 14 st 6 lb)
- Position: Defence
- Shot: Left
- Played for: New York Islanders; Phoenix Coyotes; DEG Metro Stars; Ässät; Lukko; Eisbären Berlin; Thomas Sabo Ice Tigers; Schwenninger Wild Wings; Lørenskog IK; Oji Eagles; Daemyung Killer Whales
- NHL draft: 202nd overall, 2000; New York Islanders
- Playing career: 2006–2018

Ryan Caldwell (born June 15, 1981) is a Canadian former professional ice hockey. During the 2005–06 season he played two games for the New York Islanders and two more in the 2007–08 season for the Phoenix Coyotes.

== Playing career ==
Prior to his professional career, Caldwell was an All-American defenceman and captained the University of Denver Pioneers to the 2004 NCAA Championship.

After two seasons in the SM-liiga with Ässät, Caldwell signed with fellow Finnish club, Lukko Rauma. During the 2012-13 season, he was mutually released from his contract and returned to the German DEL, with Eisbären Berlin.

On May 7, 2013, Caldwell was signed as a free agent to a two-year contract with the Thomas Sabo Ice Tigers. In August 2014, Caldwell and the Ice Tigers mutually agreed to terminate his contract.

On August 26, 2014, the Schwenninger Wild Wings announced they had signed Caldwell. In the 2014–15 season, Caldwell contributed with 23 points in 52 games from the blueline, however was unable to lift the Wild Wings into the playoffs. On March 7, 2015, the Wild Wings opted not to offer Caldwell a new contract, rendering him a free agent.

After joining Norwegian club, Lørenskog IK midway through the 2015–16 season, Caldwell continued his journeyman career in the following summer by signing a one-year deal with Japanese club, Oji Eagles of the Asia League on July 22, 2016.

== Career statistics ==
			Regular season					Playoffs
Season	Team	League	GP	G	A	Pts	PIM	GP	G	A	Pts	PIM
1998–99	Shattuck–Saint Mary's	HSMN	29	24	55	79	22	—	—	—	—	—
1999–2000	Thunder Bay Flyers	USHL	46	3	20	23	152	—	—	—	—	—
2000–01	University of Denver	WCHA	36	3	20	23	76	—	—	—	—	—
2001–02	University of Denver	WCHA	40	3	16	19	76	—	—	—	—	—
2002–03	University of Denver	WCHA	38	5	14	19	58	—	—	—	—	—
2003–04	University of Denver	WCHA	42	15	12	27	96	—	—	—	—	—
2004–05	Bridgeport Sound Tigers	AHL	73	2	19	21	65	—	—	—	—	—
2005–06	Bridgeport Sound Tigers	AHL	61	3	12	15	38	7	1	1	2	2
2005–06	New York Islanders	NHL	2	0	0	0	2	—	—	—	—	—
2006–07	Syracuse Crunch	AHL	61	7	23	30	94	—	—	—	—	—
2007–08	San Antonio Rampage	AHL	71	3	18	21	94	7	0	0	0	4
2007–08	Phoenix Coyotes	NHL	2	0	0	0	2	—	—	—	—	—
2008–09	DEG Metro Stars	DEL	47	4	14	18	132	15	3	7	10	33
2009–10	DEG Metro Stars	DEL	55	5	16	21	75	3	0	0	0	6
2010–11	Ässät	SM-l	37	6	19	25	85	6	0	3	3	8
2011–12	Ässät	SM-l	33	3	10	13	28	3	0	2	2	0
2012–13	Lukko	SM-l	37	1	12	13	26	—	—	—	—	—
2012–13	Eisbären Berlin	DEL	11	0	3	3	18	13	1	2	3	20
2013–14	Thomas Sabo Ice Tigers	DEL	46	2	19	21	79	6	0	0	0	4
2014–15	Schwenninger Wild Wings	DEL	52	3	20	23	48	—	—	—	—	—
2015–16	Lørenskog IK	NOR	13	2	5	7	12	16	0	5	5	26
2016–17	Oji Eagles	ALH	46	5	30	35	81	2	1	2	3	2
2017–18	Daemyung Killer Whales	ALH	26	0	10	10	47	—	—	—	—	—
AHL totals			266	14	73	87	291	14	1	1	2	6
NHL totals			4	0	0	0	4	—	—	—	—	—
DEL totals			211	14	72	86	352	37	4	9	13	63

== Awards and honours ==
Award	Year
College
All-WCHA Rookie Team	2001
WCHA All-Tournament Team	2002
All-WCHA Second Team	2004
AHCA West First-Team All-American	2004
All-NCAA All-Tournament Team	2004

Awards and achievements
Preceded by Joe Cullen / Aaron MacKenzie	WCHA Defensive Player of the Year; 2003–04	Succeeded by Mark Stuart
