= Lefty McFadden Invitational =

Tournament information
- Sport: College ice hockey
- Location: Denver, Colorado
- Number of tournaments: 5
- Format: Single-elimination
- Venue: Nutter Center
- Teams: 4

Final champion
- Ohio State

The Lefty McFadden Invitational was a mid-season college ice hockey tournament first played in 2002. It was discontinued after 2007.

== History ==
In 2002, a college ice hockey tournament was founded in honor of long-time executive Edgar "Lefty" McFadden. Having worked as a sports writer for the Dayton Daily News and served as both GM and vice president of the Dayton Gems, the Nutter Center in Dayton, Ohio was a logical place to hold the tournament. The nearest Division I team, Miami, served as host for the tournament, which was conducted at the beginning of the season. Just over two years into the tournament's existence, Lefty McFadden died at the age of 81. The series survived for two more years before going on hiatus .

The tournament returned in 2007 with Ohio State as host but was not renewed after the season.

== Results ==
Year	Champion	Runner-up	Third place	Fourth place
2002	Miami	Bowling Green	Niagara	Air Force
2003	Denver	St. Lawrence	Ohio State	Miami
2004	Miami	Northeastern	Michigan	Boston University
2005	Michigan State	North Dakota	Miami	Wayne State
2007	Ohio State	Wisconsin	Notre Dame	Mercyhurst

== Game results ==
=== 2002 ===
Semifinals; October 4
Miami	12
Air Force	1
Bowling Green	4
Niagara	1

Championship; October 5
Miami	2
Bowling Green	1
Third place
Air Force	3
Niagara	7

=== 2003 ===
Semifinals; October 3
Miami	1
St. Lawrence	3
Denver	5
Ohio State	2

Championship; October 4
St. Lawrence	0
Denver	3
Third place
Miami	3
Ohio State	5

=== 2004 ===
Semifinals; October 8
Miami	5
Boston University	1
Michigan	2
Northeastern	4

Championship; October 9
Miami	6
Northeastern	2
Third place
Boston University	2
Michigan	7

=== 2005 ===
Semifinals; October 8
Miami	0
North Dakota	3
Michigan State	5
Wayne State	1

Championship; October 9
North Dakota	0
Michigan State	3
Third place
Miami	4
Wayne State	0

=== 2007 ===
Semifinals; October 12
Ohio State	2
Mercyhurst	1
Notre Dame	1
Wisconsin	4

Championship; October 13
Ohio State	5
Wisconsin	3
Third place
Mercyhurst	0
Notre Dame	4

== Participating teams ==
Team	# of times participated	Titles
Miami	4	2
Ohio State	2	1
Denver	1	1
Michigan State	1	1
Air Force	1	0
Boston University	1	0
Bowling Green	1	0
Mercyhurst	1	0
Michigan	1	0
Niagara	1	0
North Dakota	1	0
Northeastern	1	0
Notre Dame	1	0
St. Lawrence	1	0
Wayne State	1	0
Wisconsin	1	0
