= Mike Prpich =

Canadian ice hockey player

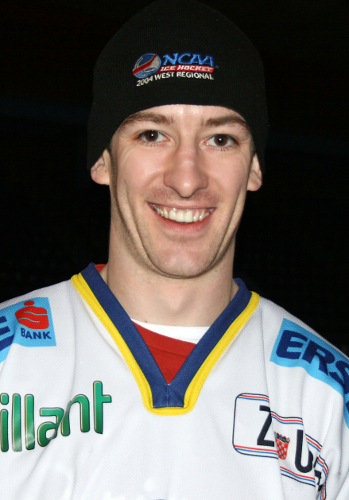
- Born: March 27, 1982 (age 43); Kenaston, Saskatchewan, CAN
- Height: 6 ft 0 in (183 cm)
- Weight: 180 lb (82 kg; 12 st 12 lb)
- Position: Wing
- Shoots: Left
- EBEL team: KHL Medveščak
- NHL draft: Undrafted
- Playing career: 2006–present

Mike Prpich (born March 27, 1982) is a Canadian professional ice hockey player of Croatian ancestry. He plays both wing positions and is currently a member of the Kenaston Blizzard who play in the Sask Valley Hockey League.

== Playing career ==
Born in Kenaston, Saskatchewan, Prpich started his career as a junior for the Penticton Panthers in the BCHL where in the 2000–01 season he played 52 matches scoring 25 goals and 21 assists. Four years of study (2002–2006) at the University of North Dakota was the springboard for his future. Specifically, during this period in the NCAA he played in 160 games with 31 goals and 21 assists culminating with a conference title in his final year in 2006.

After his senior season of collegiate hockey, Prpich made his professional debut at the end of the 2005–06 season in a brief stint with the Iowa Stars of the AHL, playing only two games. However, in the 2006–07 season, as the member of the New Mexico Scorpions, who play in the CHL, he shined and has excelled in 64 duels with 23 goals and 22 assists. AHL and CHL experience opened doors to the highest British EIHL league and the Cardiff Devils with whom he had spent two seasons. In his last season with the Devils he led the team scoring 35 goals and 34 assists in 57 games.

On June 30, 2009, Prpich signed a one-year contract with Croatian team KHL Medveščak in the Austrian Hockey League. In the 2009–10 season, Prpich scored 6 goals in 47 games as the Bears progressed to the playoffs. On September 28, 2009, Mike was suspended for 3 games after fighting a Vienna Capitals player and finished the season amassing 116 penalty minutes.

== Career statistics ==
			Regular season					Playoffs
Season	Team	League	GP	G	A	Pts	PIM	GP	G	A	Pts	PIM
2000–01	Penticton Panthers	BCHL	52	25	21	46	192	—	—	—	—	—
2002–03	University of North Dakota	WCHA	40	8	9	17	55	—	—	—	—	—
2003–04	University of North Dakota	WCHA	37	9	6	15	95	—	—	—	—	—
2004–05	University of North Dakota	WCHA	39	7	1	8	76	—	—	—	—	—
2005–06	University of North Dakota	WCHA	45	7	5	12	104	—	—	—	—	—
2005–06	Iowa Stars	AHL	2	0	1	1	0	—	—	—	—	—
2006–07	New Mexico Scorpions	CHL	64	23	22	45	188	16	14	6	20	46
2007–08	Cardiff Devils	EIHL	7	1	3	4	5	—	—	—	—	—
2008–09	Cardiff Devils	EIHL	47	28	31	59	79	3	0	3	3	6
2009–10	KHL Medveščak	EBEL	47	6	2	8	90	11	1	0	1	26
2010-11	Newcastle Vipers	EIHL	35	16	32	48	114	—	—	—	—	—
