= Trevor Frischmon =

American ice hockey player

- Born: August 5, 1981 (age 44) Ham Lake, Minnesota, U.S.
- Height: 6 ft 0 in (183 cm)
- Weight: 202 lb (92 kg; 14 st 6 lb)
- Position: Center
- Shot: Left
- Played for: Columbus Blue Jackets; Graz 99ers Mora IK; Coventry Blaze
- NHL draft: Undrafted
- Playing career: 2006–2015

Trevor John Frischmon (born August 5, 1981) is an American professional ice hockey center who is currently an unrestricted free agent who spent a short period of time playing in the National Hockey League (NHL) with the Columbus Blue Jackets.

Undrafted, Frischmon played within the Blue Jackets organization for 5 seasons. He featured in 3 NHL games with the Blue Jackets during the 2009–10 season. After his fifth season with the Blue Jackets American Hockey League affiliates, Frischmon left as a free agent to sign a one-year, two way contract with the New York Islanders on July 5, 2011. Frischmon never played with the Islanders, having been assigned to their AHL affiliate, the Bridgeport Sound Tigers for the duration of the 2011–12 season.

He later embarked on a European career, with the Graz 99ers, Mora IK and most recently played with the Coventry Blaze in the Elite Ice Hockey League.

== Career statistics ==
			Regular season					Playoffs
Season	Team	League	GP	G	A	Pts	PIM	GP	G	A	Pts	PIM
1998–99	Blaine High School	HSMN
1999–2000	Blaine High School	HSMN
1999–2000	Lincoln Stars	USHL	4	1	1	2	4	8	0	2	2	0
2000–01	Lincoln Stars	USHL	55	13	18	31	49	11	4	1	5	0
2001–02	Lincoln Stars	USHL	58	17	28	45	38	4	0	2	2	2
2002–03	Colorado College	WCHA	38	3	4	7	22	—	—	—	—	—
2003–04	Colorado College	WCHA	39	10	7	17	34	—	—	—	—	—
2004–05	Colorado College	WCHA	42	10	16	26	24	—	—	—	—	—
2005–06	Colorado College	WCHA	41	7	9	16	41	—	—	—	—	—
2006–07	Dayton Bombers	ECHL	24	5	8	13	14	20	3	5	8	24
2006–07	Syracuse Crunch	AHL	33	0	7	7	10	—	—	—	—	—
2007–08	Syracuse Crunch	AHL	59	5	11	16	38	13	1	2	3	10
2007–08	Charlotte Checkers	ECHL	7	1	4	5	2	—	—	—	—	—
2008–09	Syracuse Crunch	AHL	80	5	20	25	57	—	—	—	—	—
2009–10	Syracuse Crunch	AHL	75	7	18	25	34	—	—	—	—	—
2009–10	Columbus Blue Jackets	NHL	3	0	0	0	4	—	—	—	—	—
2010–11	Springfield Falcons	AHL	80	4	25	29	39	—	—	—	—	—
2011–12	Bridgeport Sound Tigers	AHL	69	11	17	28	43	3	0	0	0	0
2012–13	Graz 99ers	AUT	42	5	9	14	34	5	0	0	0	0
2013–14	Mora IK	Allsv	22	2	4	6	10	—	—	—	—	—
2014–15	Coventry Blaze	EIHL	3	1	1	2	0	—	—	—	—	—
AHL totals			396	32	98	130	221	16	1	2	3	10
NHL totals			3	0	0	0	4	—	—	—	—	—
