= Aaron MacKenzie =

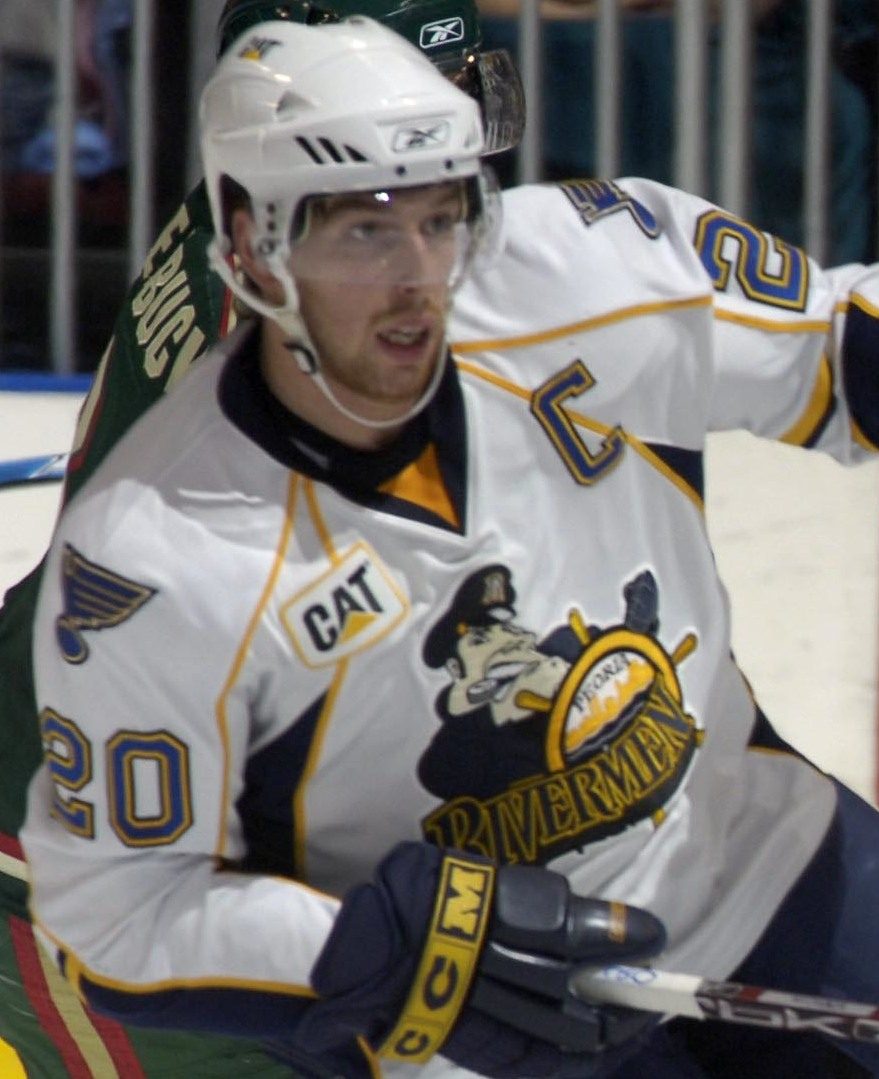
- MacKenzie with the Peoria Rivermen in 2007
- Born: March 7, 1981 (age 45) Terrace Bay, Ontario, Canada
- Height: 6 ft 1 in (185 cm)
- Weight: 195 lb (88 kg; 13 st 13 lb)
- Position: Defence
- Shot: Left
- Played for: Colorado Avalanche; HC Pardubice; EHC Black Wings Linz; Tohoku Free Blades
- NHL draft: Undrafted
- Playing career: 2003–2015

Aaron G. MacKenzie (born March 7, 1981, in Terrace Bay, Ontario) is a Canadian former professional ice hockey defenceman. He played in the National Hockey League (NHL) with the Colorado Avalanche, during an 11-year career.

== Playing career ==
Undrafted, MacKenzie played junior hockey with the Thunder Bay Flyers of the USHL, before playing collegiate hockey with the University of Denver for four years. After his senior year, as Captain of the Pioneers, MacKenzie turned pro signing with the St. Louis Blues on October 6, 2003.

MacKenzie made his professional debut in the 2003–04 season with Blues affiliate, the Worcester IceCats of the AHL. While never playing a game with the Blues, Mackenzie became a fixture in the AHL, playing with the Blues affiliates for 5 years.

On July 14, 2008, MacKenzie signed with the Colorado Avalanche and was assigned to affiliate, the Lake Erie Monsters, to start the 2008–09 season. MacKenzie received his first NHL recall on November 29, 2008, but did not feature in a game for the Avalanche. Towards the end of the season, MacKenzie was recalled again to the Avalanche on April 4, 2009, and made his NHL debut in a 4–1 victory against the Vancouver Canucks on April 5, 2009.

Unsigned prior to the 2009-10 season, MacKenzie signed with the Idaho Steelheads of the ECHL on October 19, 2009. After appearing in 3 games with the Steelheads, Aaron left the team to sign with HC Pardubice of the Czech Extraliga on November 2, 2009. MacKenzie settled as a stay-at-home defender in the Czech Republic and appeared in 29 games to help, the Dominik Hašek inspired Pardubice, capture the Championship for the first time since 2005.

On June 16, 2010, Mackenzie left Pardubice and signed as a free agent to a one-year contract with Austrian team, EHC Black Wings Linz of the EBEL.

MacKenzie spent the 2011-2012 season with the Tohoku Free Blades of the Asia League Ice Hockey in Hachinohe, Japan.

On June 12, 2012, MacKenzie signed with the Central Hockey League's Denver Cutthroats, making him the first signed player in franchise history. After two seasons as captain of the Cutthroats, coming off a finals appearance, MacKenzie retired from his professional career.

== Career statistics ==
			Regular season					Playoffs
Season	Team	League	GP	G	A	Pts	PIM	GP	G	A	Pts	PIM
1998–99	Thunder Bay Flyers	USHL	49	8	12	20	123	3	0	1	1	0
1999–00	U. of Denver	WCHA	40	1	9	10	56	—	—	—	—	—
2000–01	U. of Denver	WCHA	37	2	6	8	45	—	—	—	—	—
2001–02	U. of Denver	WCHA	39	5	18	23	30	—	—	—	—	—
2002–03	U. of Denver	WCHA	41	11	21	32	33	—	—	—	—	—
2003–04	Worcester IceCats	AHL	66	5	9	14	108	10	0	2	2	10
2004–05	Worcester IceCats	AHL	75	2	13	15	106	—	—	—	—	—
2005–06	Peoria Rivermen	AHL	51	2	7	9	35	4	0	0	0	6
2006–07	Peoria Rivermen	AHL	67	1	6	7	46	—	—	—	—	—
2007–08	Peoria Rivermen	AHL	55	0	5	5	20	—	—	—	—	—
2008–09	Lake Erie Monsters	AHL	52	3	9	12	50	—	—	—	—	—
2008–09	Colorado Avalanche	NHL	5	0	0	0	0	—	—	—	—	—
2009–10	Idaho Steelheads	ECHL	3	0	0	0	2	—	—	—	—	—
2009–10	HC Pardubice	CZE	29	0	1	1	24	6	0	1	1	8
2010–11	EHC Black Wings Linz	EBEL	49	3	7	10	100	5	0	0	0	0
2011–12	Tohoku Free Blades	ALH	36	9	14	23	36	—	—	—	—	—
2012–13	Denver Cutthroats	CHL	20	4	6	10	10	—	—	—	—	—
2013–14	Denver Cutthroats	CHL	59	8	17	25	52	16	2	4	6	14
2014–15	Sun Valley Suns	BDHL	4	2	2	4	2	—	—	—	—	—
NHL totals			5	0	0	0	0	—	—	—	—	—
AHL totals			366	13	49	62	365	14	0	2	2	16

== Awards and honors ==
Award	Year
College
All-WCHA Third Team	2001–02
All-WCHA First Team	2002–03

Awards and achievements
Preceded by Jordan Leopold	WCHA Defensive Player of the Year; 2002–03; With: Joe Cullen	Succeeded by Ryan Caldwell
