= Kellen Briggs =

American ice hockey player (born 1983)

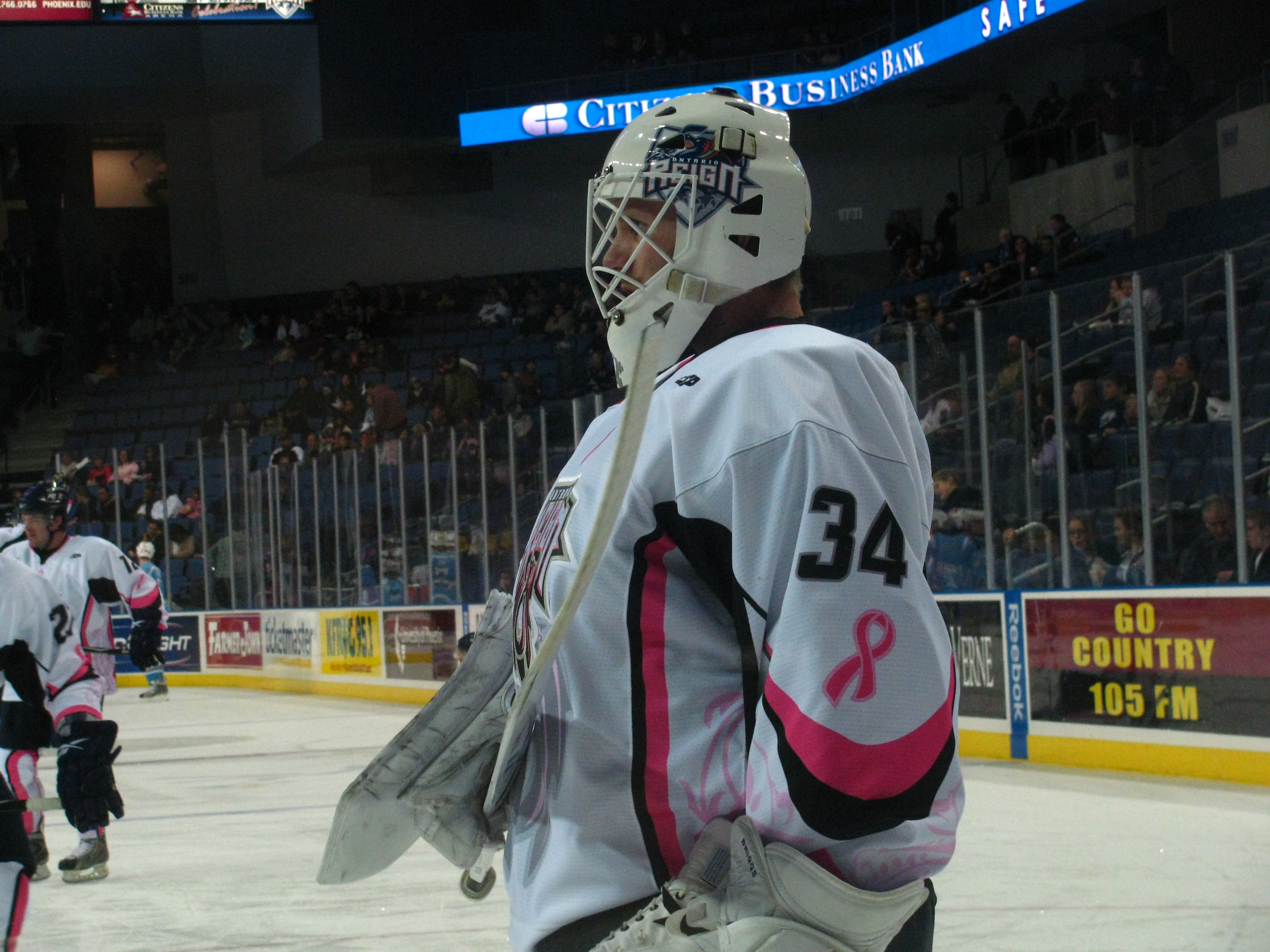
- Born: June 28, 1983 (age 43) Colorado Springs, Colorado, U.S.
- Height: 5 ft 11 in (180 cm)
- Weight: 187 lb (85 kg; 13 st 5 lb)
- Position: Goaltender
- Caught: Left
- Played for: Portland Pirates; Dresdner Eislöwen; Heilbronner Falken
- NHL draft: Undrafted
- Playing career: 2007–2013

Kellen Briggs (born June 28, 1983) is an American former professional ice hockey goaltender.

== Playing career ==
Briggs graduated from Roosevelt High School in Sioux Falls, South Dakota. He played three seasons with the USHL's Sioux Falls Stampede, where he led the USHL in saves (1,422) and total minutes played (2,529).

He spent the next four years (2003–2007) tending goal for the Minnesota Golden Gophers. He recorded 25 wins in his first year, which set the school record for a freshman. His sophomore year, he went with the team to the Frozen Four, and was co-recipient of the John Mariucci team MVP award.

Briggs' senior year at the University of Minnesota, he served as alternate team captain. He was the first goaltender since 1973 to receive that honor. He helped the Golden Gophers win the McNaughton Cup and the Broadmoor Trophy in 2007. He also holds the school record for most wins in a career (84), and most shutouts in a career (13).

In October 2007, Briggs played in his first professional game with the Idaho Steelheads. He was picked to play in the 2007 National Conference All-Star game in the ECHL, and had his first American Hockey League call-up when he was loaned to the Rockford IceHogs though he didn't get to play on ice. He moved to the Ontario Reign in 2008 which was followed by a spell in the AHL for the Portland Pirates. He then moved to Germany in the 2nd Bundesliga with Dresdner Eislöwen before returning to the Ontario Reign in 2010.

== Career statistics ==
			Regular season									Playoffs
Season	Team	League	GP	W	L	OT	MIN	GA	SO	GAA	SV%	GP	W	L	MIN	GA	SO	GAA	SV%
2000–01	Sioux Falls Stampede	USHL	25	16	7	0	1224	69	0	3.38	.900	4	—	—	—	—	—	3.67	.895
2001–02	Sioux Falls Stampede	USHL	45	25	15	1	2366	134	2	3.40	.903	2	—	—	—	—	—	—	—
2002–03	Sioux Falls Stampede	USHL	45	16	23	4	2526	156	2	3.71	.901	—	—	—	—	—	—	—	—
2003–04	University of Minnesota	WCHA	40	25	10	3	2199	96	4	2.62	.894	—	—	—	—	—	—	—	—
2004–05	University of Minnesota	WCHA	33	21	11	0	1895	75	4	2.37	.914	—	—	—	—	—	—	—	—
2005–06	University of Minnesota	WCHA	32	21	6	3	1832	78	3	2.55	.904	—	—	—	—	—	—	—	—
2006–07	University of Minnesota	WCHA	26	17	7	2	1519	54	2	2.13	.917	—	—	—	—	—	—	—	—
2007–08	Idaho Steelheads	ECHL	31	17	11	2	1802	54	2	2.36	.920	—	—	—	—	—	—	—	—
2008–09	Ontario Reign	ECHL	12	7	5	0	716	29	1	2.43	.927	—	—	—	—	—	—	—	—
2008–09	Portland Pirates	AHL	6	3	3	0	358	17	0	2.85	.903	1	0	0	32	1	0	1.85	.950
2009–10	Dresdner Eislöwen	2.GBun	46	23	22	0	2757	129	5	2.81	—	3	—	—	—	—	—	2.41	—
2010–11	Ontario Reign	ECHL	27	9	16	1	1529	93	0	3.65	.890	—	—	—	—	—	—	—	—
2010–11	Heilbronner Falken	2.GBun	13	11	2	0	787	27	2	2.06	—	3	—	—	—	—	—	4.07	—
2011–12	Dresdner Eislöwen	2.GBun	21	6	13	0	1215	65	1	3.21	—	—	—	—	—	—	—	—	—
2012–13	Dresdner Eislöwen	2.GBun	31	16	15	0	1823	79	1	2.60	—	—	—	—	—	—	—	—	—
AHL totals			6	3	3	0	358	17	0	2.85	.903	1	0	0	32	1	0	1.85	.950

== Awards and honors ==
Award	Year
College
WCHA All-Tournament Team	2004
WCHA Tournament MVP	2004
Frank Pond Rookie of the Year	2005
WCHA All-Academic Team	2006

Awards and achievements
Preceded by Grant Potulny	WCHA Most Valuable Player in Tournament; 2004	Succeeded by Brett Sterling
