= Connor James (ice hockey) =

Canadian ice hockey player

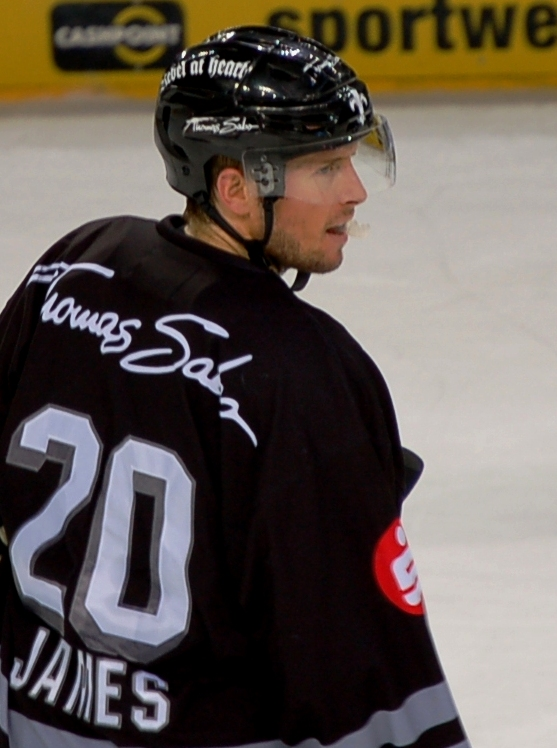
- Born: August 25, 1982 (age 43) Calgary, Alberta, Canada
- Height: 5 ft 10 in (178 cm)
- Weight: 176 lb (80 kg; 12 st 8 lb)
- Position: Center
- Shot: Right
- Played for: Los Angeles Kings; Pittsburgh Penguins; Augsburger Panther; DEG Metro Stars; Thomas Sabo Ice Tigers; Straubing Tigers
- NHL draft: 279th overall, 2002; Los Angeles Kings
- Playing career: 2004–2016

Connor James (born August 25, 1982) is a Canadian former professional ice hockey centre. He most recently played with the Straubing Tigers of the German Deutsche Eishockey Liga (DEL).

== Playing career ==
James was drafted in the ninth round, 279th overall, by the Los Angeles Kings in the 2002 NHL entry draft. James played for 4 years for the University of Denver and won one NCAA National Championship with the Pioneers. He appeared in two National Hockey League games with the Kings in the 2005–06 season.

James then signed with the Pittsburgh Penguins organization prior to the 2006–07 season. The following season while called up to the Penguins on February 16, 2008, Conner scored his first NHL goal against Rick DiPietro of the New York Islanders. In September 2008, the Penguins cut James from the active roster for the 2008–09 season, returning to affiliate the Wilkes-Barre/Scranton Penguins. On March 25, 2009, James was named the 14th captain in team history.

On July 31, 2009, James signed for Augsburger Panther of the DEL. After a season with the Panthers and two following seasons with the DEG Metro Stars, James signed for his third DEL team, with a one-year contract with the Thomas Sabo Ice Tigers on May 7, 2012. He spent three seasons with the Ice Tigers, before moving to fellow DEL side Straubing Tigers for the 2015–16 campaign.

== Career statistics ==
			Regular Season					Playoffs
Season	Team	League	GP	G	A	Pts	PIM	GP	G	A	Pts	PIM
1999–2000	Calgary Royals	AJHL	64	36	57	93	41	—	—	—	—	—
2000–01	University of Denver	WCHA	38	8	19	27	14	—	—	—	—	—
2001–02	University of Denver	WCHA	41	16	26	42	18	—	—	—	—	—
2002–03	University of Denver	WCHA	41	20	23	43	12	—	—	—	—	—
2003–04	University of Denver	WCHA	40	13	25	38	16	—	—	—	—	—
2004–05	Bakersfield Condors	ECHL	51	21	25	46	34	5	3	1	4	0
2004–05	Manchester Monarchs	AHL	14	2	1	3	10	3	0	0	0	0
2005–06	Manchester Monarchs	AHL	77	17	25	42	43	7	0	0	0	2
2005–06	Los Angeles Kings	NHL	2	0	0	0	0	—	—	—	—	—
2006–07	Wilkes–Barre/Scranton Penguins	AHL	70	12	20	32	29	11	4	4	8	8
2007–08	Wilkes–Barre/Scranton Penguins	AHL	64	9	28	37	30	22	8	5	13	6
2007–08	Pittsburgh Penguins	NHL	13	1	0	1	2	—	—	—	—	—
2008–09	Wilkes–Barre/Scranton Penguins	AHL	76	19	30	49	24	9	0	2	2	2
2008–09	Pittsburgh Penguins	NHL	1	0	0	0	0	—	—	—	—	—
2009–10	Augsburger Panther	DEL	55	15	38	53	28	14	4	8	12	6
2010–11	DEG Metro Stars	DEL	52	10	32	42	20	9	2	1	3	2
2011–12	DEG Metro Stars	DEL	52	15	30	45	20	7	0	7	7	4
2012–13	Thomas Sabo Ice Tigers	DEL	52	17	23	40	24	3	1	1	2	0
2013–14	Thomas Sabo Ice Tigers	DEL	52	13	27	40	20	6	1	3	4	0
2014–15	Thomas Sabo Ice Tigers	DEL	51	6	17	23	20	8	0	4	4	4
2015–16	Straubing Tigers	DEL	50	12	19	31	20	7	0	1	1	0
AHL totals			301	59	104	163	136	52	12	11	23	18
NHL totals			16	1	0	1	2	—	—	—	—	—
DEL totals			364	88	186	274	152	54	8	25	33	16

== Awards and honors ==
Award	Year
All-WCHA Third Team	2001–02
All-NCAA All-Tournament Team	2004

Awards and achievements
Preceded by Tom Preissing	WCHA Student-Athlete of the Year; 2003–04	Succeeded by Steven Johns
