= Luke Stauffacher =

American ice hockey player

- Born: December 17, 1980 (age 44); Madison, Wisconsin, U.S.
- Height: 5 ft 8 in (173 cm)
- Weight: 170 lb (77 kg; 12 st 2 lb)
- Position: Right Wing
- Shoots: Right
- CHL team Former teams: Odessa Jackalopes; Peoria Rivermen; Charlotte Checkers; Trenton Titans; Fresno Falcons; Manchester Phoenix
- NHL draft: Undrafted
- Playing career: 2005–present

Luke Stauffacher (born December 17, 1980, in Madison, Wisconsin) is an American professional ice hockey player, currently playing for the Odessa Jackalopes of the Central Hockey League.

== Playing career ==
He began his junior career playing for the Green Bay Gamblers in the USHL. During his time in Green Bay, Stauffacher was a regular first team player, featuring in 189 games and scoring 116 points over a four-year spell.

Stauffacher went on to play at University level, icing for the University of Minnesota - Duluth at NCAA level. Stauffacher spent four years in Minnesota, and was again a regular first team player and a reliable player in terms of both goals and assists. During the 2004–05 season, Stauffacher was signed by the Peoria Rivermen of the ECHL, but only played two games.

The following season he moved to another ECHL team, the Charlotte Checkers. Stauffacher appeared in over 50 games for the Checkers, grabbing 20 points along the way. Late in the season he again switched teams to play for the Trenton Titans, for whom he also made two post-season appearances. Stauffacher would again move during the off season, this time to link up with the UHL Quad City Mallards. At the lower level, Stauffacher would flourish, totalling almost a point a game during a 76-game regular season stint.

Due to his points production, Stauffacher would move back to the ECHL for the start of the 2007–08 season, but would only manage five appearances before moving to sign for the Manchester Phoenix mid-season, where he played alongside former Quad City Mallards line-mate Sean Starke. In 43 appearances for the Phoenix, Stauffacher managed to score 16 goals and help out with 28 assists, a ratio of just over a point per game. Despite this he was not re-signed by the Phoenix and moved back to his native North America and signed for the Muskegon Lumberjacks of the International Hockey League.

A free agent for the 2009–10 season, Stauffacher joined the Tulsa Oilers mid-year for the duration of the season on February 23, 2010.

== Career stats ==
			Regular season					Playoffs
Season	Team	League	GP	G	A	Pts	PIM	GP	G	A	Pts	PIM
1997–98	Green Bay Gamblers	USHL	23	0	3	3	42	4	0	0	0	6
1998–99	Green Bay Gamblers	USHL	54	9	20	29	74	6	2	0	2	4
1999–00	Green Bay Gamblers	USHL	56	17	21	38	138	14	5	3	8	28
2000–01	Green Bay Gamblers	USHL	56	13	33	46	114	4	1	0	1	6
2001–02	U. of Minnesota-Duluth	WCHA	33	0	4	4	26	—	—	—	—	—
2002–03	U. of Minnesota-Duluth	WCHA	41	12	10	22	80	—	—	—	—	—
2003–04	U. of Minnesota-Duluth	WCHA	42	17	18	35	54	—	—	—	—	—
2004–05	U. of Minnesota-Duluth	WCHA	38	7	6	13	24	—	—	—	—	—
2004–05	Peoria Rivermen	ECHL	2	0	0	0	15	—	—	—	—	—
2005–06	Charlotte Checkers	ECHL	52	9	11	20	84	—	—	—	—	—
2005–06	Trenton Titans	ECHL	15	1	3	4	33	2	0	1	1	0
2006–07	Quad City Mallards	UHL	76	42	29	71	221	5	0	0	0	16
2007–08	Fresno Falcons	ECHL	5	0	0	0	16	—	—	—	—	—
2007–08	Manchester Phoenix	EIHL	39	13	25	38	43	2	2	2	4	4
2008–09	Muskegon Lumberjacks	IHL	70	39	41	80	129	11	7	1	8	18
2009–10	Tulsa Oilers	CHL	13	5	2	7	38	—	—	—	—	—
2010–11	Odessa Jackalopes	CHL	13	5	3	8	26	9	0	3	3	15
ECHL totals			74	10	14	24	148	2	0	1	1	0
