= Adam Berkhoel =

American ice hockey player (born 1981)

- Born: May 16, 1981 (age 44) Saint Paul, Minnesota, U.S.
- Height: 5 ft 11 in (180 cm)
- Weight: 190 lb (86 kg; 13 st 8 lb)
- Position: Goaltender
- Caught: Left
- Played for: Atlanta Thrashers
- NHL draft: 240th overall, 2000; Chicago Blackhawks
- Playing career: 2004–2010

Adam James Berkhoel (born May 16, 1981) is an American former professional ice hockey goaltender who played in the National Hockey League (NHL) with the Atlanta Thrashers. He was drafted 240th overall in the 2000 NHL entry draft by the Chicago Blackhawks.

== Playing career ==
Prior to his professional career, Berkhoel attended Stillwater High School before he backstopped the University of Denver to the 2004 NCAA title, with a memorable 1–0 shutout of the University of Maine in the Championship game, including stopping a six-on-three skaters advantage for Maine in the final 90 seconds of the contest. The opposing goaltender in that game was Jimmy Howard. Howard and Berkhoel would later become teammates in Grand Rapids in 2007–08.

Berkhoel was originally drafted by the Chicago Blackhawks in 2000 but was eventually traded to the Atlanta Thrashers for future considerations. He played his first set of NHL games once the Thrashers ran into goaltending troubles in the 2005–06 season where he went 2–4–1 in seven full games while posting a .882 SV% and a 3.80 GAA along with one shutout. The Thrashers opted not to re-sign him, and Berkhoel signed with the Buffalo Sabres during the offseason preceding the 2006–07 season.

On July 16, 2007, Berkhoel was signed as a free agent by the Detroit Red Wings to play for their affiliate the Grand Rapids Griffins of the AHL. On August 15, 2008, Berkhoel signed a two-year contract with the Pittsburgh Penguins' AHL affiliate, the Wilkes-Barre/Scranton Penguins. After the conclusion of his deal with the Penguins, Berkhoel announced his retirement from professional hockey.

== Career statistics ==
			Regular season									Playoffs
Season	Team	League	GP	W	L	T/OT	MIN	GA	SO	GAA	SV%	GP	W	L	MIN	GA	SO	GAA	SV%
1999–00	Twin City Vulcans	USHL	49	25	15	7	2848	129	5	2.72	.923	13	7	6	—	—	—	3.24	—
2000–01	University of Denver	WCHA	15	7	6	1	745	38	1	3.06	.884	—	—	—	—	—	—	—	—
2001–02	University of Denver	WCHA	18	12	4	1	1026	40	1	2.34	.917	—	—	—	—	—	—	—	—
2002–03	University of Denver	WCHA	26	12	6	4	1436	55	3	2.30	.908	—	—	—	—	—	—	—	—
2003–04	University of Denver	WCHA	39	24	11	4	2225	91	7	2.45	.918	—	—	—	—	—	—	—	—
2004–05	Gwinnett Gladiators	ECHL	24	9	10	5	1458	59	2	2.43	.913	7	4	1	—	—	0	1.53	.938
2004–05	Chicago Wolves	AHL	1	0	1	0	59	4	0	4.04	.875	—	—	—	—	—	—	—	—
2005–06	Chicago Wolves	AHL	11	3	6	0	526	32	0	3.65	.882	—	—	—	—	—	—	—	—
2005–06	Atlanta Thrashers	NHL	9	2	4	1	473	30	0	3.30	.882	—	—	—	—	—	—	—	—
2005–06	Gwinnett Gladiators	ECHL	15	10	4	1	902	41	1	2.73	.909	9	6	3	—	—	0	3.27	.882
2006–07	Dayton Bombers	ECHL	43	23	17	3	2584	105	5	2.44	.910	22	12	10	1386	59	0	2.56	.914
2006–07	Rochester Americans	AHL	6	2	3	0	316	17	0	3.22	.899	—	—	—	—	—	—	—	—
2007–08	Grand Rapids Griffins	AHL	31	10	14	4	1697	83	1	2.93	.888	—	—	—	—	—	—	—	—
2008–09	Wilkes-Barre/Scranton Penguins	AHL	28	15	11	2	1635	69	4	2.53	.910	6	3	2	340	12	0	2.12	.937
2009–10	Wheeling Nailers	ECHL	28	12	11	3	1590	83	0	3.13	.888	—	—	—	—	—	—	—	—
2009–10	Wilkes-Barre/Scranton Penguins	AHL	7	4	3	0	403	20	1	2.98	.892	—	—	—	—	—	—	—	—
NHL totals			9	2	4	1	473	30	0	3.80	.882	—	—	—	—	—	—	—	—

== Awards and honors ==
Award	Year
College
All-WCHA Third Team	2001–02, 2003–04
All-NCAA All-Tournament Team	2004
Tournament MVP	2004
ECHL
First All-Star Team	2006–07
Goaltender of the Year	2006–07

Awards and achievements
Preceded by Thomas Vanek	NCAA Tournament Most Outstanding Player; 2004	Succeeded by Peter Mannino
