= List of schools in Regina, Saskatchewan =

This is a list of schools (at the elementary and secondary level) that are located in Regina, Saskatchewan, Canada. The three main school divisions encompassing the city are the Regina Board of Education (also known as the Regina public school board; the largest school division in the province), Regina Catholic Schools, the Roman Catholic school board, and the Conseil des Écoles Fransaskoises - also known as CÉF, the provincial Francophone school division. The public system has approximately 27,369 students enrolled across the city; the Catholic board has an enrolment number of approximately 14,204 students; and CÉF has about 500 students in this city. There are also a number of independent schools located in Regina, including Luther College High School and Regina Christian School.

Historically, the publicly funded separate schools were exclusively for the children of Catholic and Francophone families, who were, by way of ensuring continued support for the separate school system and also as a matter of Catholic doctrine, discouraged from enrolling in the public schools, which were officially secular but which originally maintained a degree of de facto Protestant religious education. Latterly, with a broadly secular ethos having taken hold across Canadian society and the general school population being considerably lower than in the past, enrollment by non-Catholic children in separate schools and by Catholic children in public schools has been less discouraged. This reflects that curricula for all schools in Saskatchewan are set by the provincial department of education, known as Saskatchewan Learning.

Francophone Education in Regina was inaugurated in 1980 when the city's francophone parents opened their own school. In the coming years, they would successfully seek to obtain control of their own school board through the courts, which eventually led to an amended Education Act in 1995 that effectively created a third public and legal entity of education in the province: la Division scolaire francophone No. 310.

In Saskatchewan, elementary school generally takes place from Kindergarten until completion of Grade 8; education to this level has always been mandatory. Secondary school generally takes place from Grade 9 until completion of Grade 12, with the exception of some schools which offer specialized K-12 programs and alternative schools. With exception to Mother Teresa Middle School in Regina and Sion Middle School in Saskatoon, Saskatchewan has declined to introduce specialized "junior high schools".

The first school opened in Regina in 1883, a year after the city was officially incorporated. It was located in the home of Miss Fanny Laidlaw.

== Elementary schools ==
=== Public ===
- Albert Community School
- Arcola Community School
- Argyle School
- Coronation Park Community School
- Davin Elementary School
- Douglas Park School
- Dr. A.E. Perry School
- Dr. George Ferguson School
- Dr. L.M. Hanna School
- École Centennial Community School
- École Connaught Community School
- École Elsie Mironuck Community School
- École Harbour Landing School
- École Massey School
- École Wascana Plains School
- École W.S. Hawrylak School
- École Wilfrid Walker School
- Ethel Milliken School
- George Lee School
- Gladys McDonald School
- Glen Elm School
- Grant Road School
- Henry Braun School
- Henry Janzen School
- Imperial Community School
- Jack MacKenzie School
- Judge Bryant School
- Kitchener Community School
- Lakeview School
- M.J. Coldwell School
- MacNeill School
- Marion McVeety School
- McDermid Community School
- McLurg School
- Plainsview School
- Rosemont Community School
- Ruth M. Buck School
- Ruth Pawson School
- Seven Stones Community School
- Thomson Community School
- tawâw School
- W.F. Ready School
- W.H. Ford School
- Walker School
- Wilfred Hunt School

=== Catholic ===
- Deshaye Catholic School
- École St. Angela Merici School
- École St. Elizabeth School
- École St. Mary School
- École St. Pius X School
- Sacred Heart Community School
- St. Augustine Community School
- St. Bernadette School
- St. Catherine Community School
- St. Dominic Savio School
- St. Francis Community School
- St. Gabriel School
- St. Gregory School
- St. Jerome School
- St. Joan of Arc School
- St. Josaphat School
- St. Kateri Tekakwitha School (dual-track)
- St. Marguerite Bourgeoys School
- St. Matthew School
- St. Michael Community School
- St. Nicholas School
- St. Peter School
- St. Theresa School
- St. Timothy School

=== Francophone ===
- École Monseigneur de Laval - Pavillon Élémentaire
- École du Parc

== High schools ==
=== Public ===
- Balfour Collegiate
- Campbell Collegiate
- F.W. Johnson Collegiate
- Martin Collegiate
- Scott Collegiate
- Sheldon-Williams Collegiate
- Thom Collegiate
- Winston Knoll Collegiate

=== Catholic ===
- Archbishop M.C. O'Neill High School
- Dr. Martin LeBoldus High School
- Michael A. Riffel High School
- Miller Comprehensive High School

=== Francophone ===
- École Monseigneur de Laval - Pavillon Secondaire des Quatre Vents

=== Independent ===
- Luther College High School

== Other schools ==
=== Public ===
- Campus Regina Public

=== Catholic ===
- St. Luke Alternative School (K-12)
- St. Maria Faustina School

=== Independent ===
- Cornwall Alternative School (7-10)
- Curtis-Horne Christian School (K-9)
- Harvest City Christian Academy (K-12)
- Montessori School of Regina (K-8)
- Morning Star Christian Academy (1-12)
- Mother Teresa Middle School (6-8)
- Prairie Sky School (K-8)
- Regina Christian School (K-12)
- Regina Huda School (K-12)

== Defunct schools ==
=== Elementary schools ===
==== Public ====
- Al Pickard School – Closed in 1997. Demolished and is now a housing development.
- Alexandra School (Red School) – Closed in 1910.
- Assiniboine School - 3301 Robinson Street. Closed in 1985. Land redeveloped into a housing development called Lakeview Estates.
- Athabasca School - 3905 Princess Drive. Closed in 2011. Repurposed as the Sikh Society of Regina.
- Benson School – Closed in 1997. Demolished and replaced with Benson Manor, a seniors' residence.
- Boyle School
- Birchwood School - 23 Birchwood Road. Closed in 1986. Repurposed as Southside Pentecostal Assembly. Old playground redeveloped into condo units.
- Crescent School - now Cornwall Alternative School.
- Dieppe School - Closed in 2012.
- Dover School - Demolished and replaced with houses.
- Earl Grey School – Closed in 1933.
- Elsie Dorsey School – 4201 Castle Road. Closed in 1997. Demolished and is now a housing development. The old playground remains as Elsie Dorsey Park.
- Haultain Community School - Closed in 2012.
- Herchmer Community School – Closed in 2008.
- Highland Park School - Demolished and replaced with the Highland Mews housing development.
- Innismore School - Demolished and replaced with the Subsurface Geological Laboratory.
- Jean M. Brown School
- Ken Jenkins Community School - Closed in 2010.
- King Edward School
- Lorne School - Demolished and replaced with Sinclair Supply Ltd.
- Mable Brown School - Demolished and replaced with condominiums. The school's park remains intact.
- McCannel School - 4040 Garnet Street. Closed in June 1984. Demolished a few year after closing and is now the site of McCannel Condominiums.
- McLeod School - 3500 Queen Street. Repurposed as St. Mark's Lutheran Church.
- McNab School - Building is still standing, but is now a church.
- McNiven School - 1110 McNiven Avenue. Now Selo Gardens Personal Care Home and Community Centre.
- Pasqua School - was the Pasqua Neighborhood Recreation Centre until it was demolished in 2011.
- Peart School – Closed in 1997. Demolished and replaced with Wascana Villa housing development.
- Queen Elizabeth School - Demolished and is now Queen Elizabeth Park.
- R.J. Davidson School - Demolished and replaced with houses.
- Regent Park School – Closed in 1997. Repurposed as The Gathering Place
- Stewart Russell School – Closed in 2008. Demolished.
- Strathcona School – 14th Ave & Broad Street. Closed in 1984. Demolished and now the site of the Strathcona Centre strip mall.
- Transcona School - Demolished and is now the site of Transcona Park housing development.
- Union School/White School (K-12) – Closed in 1905. Demolished and replaced with Simpsons Department Store. Is now the site of the Canada Trust Building.
- old Victoria School – closed in 1958. Demolished and replaced with the downtown YMCA.
- new Victoria School - 1915 Retallack Street. Closed in 2014.
- W.C. Howe School - 30 Lockwood Road. Closed in 1997. Demolished and redeveloped as detached homes.
- Wascana School - 4210 4th Ave. Closed in 2014. Redeveloped in Regina Adult Campus.
- Wetmore School – 800-block 15th Avenue. Closed in 1997. Demolished and replaced with Wetmore Court housing development.

==== Catholic ====
- Gratton Catholic School – Closed in 1908. The contents were subsequently moved to the site of the original St. Mary School.
- Holy Rosary Community School - 3118 14th Ave. Closed in June 2024. Students moved to Sacred Heart Community School. Demolished and land given back to the Archdiocese
- St. Andrew School - closed in 2017. Now École du Parc (francophone)
- St. Anne School - Now a Catholic Family Services office.
- St. James School - 2272 Pasqua Street. Repurposed as the Saskatchewan Express Musical Theatre Studio.
- St. John School - 1601 Cowan Crescent. Now École Monseigneur de Laval.
- St. Joseph School – Closed in 1989. Demolished and is now the site of a housing development.
- St. Leo School - 4715 McTavish Street. Repurposed as the Beth Jacob Synagogue and Montessori School of Regina.
- St. Mark School - Now Regina Church of Christ.
- original St. Mary School – Closed in 1939. The school later re-opened in the north end. The SaskPower building now occupies the site of the original school.
- St. Patrick School - Now Rosewood Park Alliance Church.
- St. Paul School - Closed in June 1988. Demolished except for the gym. The gym is now part of the newly built Eastview Community Centre. St. Paul Place, seniors home, was built at the same time as the Eastview Community Centre on the land where the classrooms and part of the open school yard were located.
- St. Philip School - Now Regina Huda School.
- St. Thomas School - Demolished and replaced with Access Communications and Access Community Park.

=== High schools ===
- Campion College High School – closed in 1975; now Regina Christian School.
- Central Collegiate Institute (originally Regina Collegiate) – closed in 1985; demolished and is now the College Gardens, College Court and College Park condominium development.
- Cochrane High School – alternative school turned into Campus Regina Public
- Loretto High School
- Marian High School (formerly Sacred Heart College) – closed in 1990; demolished and is now the site of Marian Chateau Retirement Community.
- Qu'Appelle Diocesan (St Chad's) School for Girls - closed in 1970; now a condominium development.
- Robert Usher Collegiate – closed in 2008; building is now occupied by Ecole Monseigneur de Laval.
- Sacred Heart Academy – closed in 1969; now Cathedral Courts (seniors apartments).
- Sister McGuigan High School – closed in 1989; now Harvest City Church and Harvest City Christian Academy.
- St. John Bosco High School – closed in 1966; was located in the basement of Little Flower Parish.
- Ursuline High School - now Good News Chapel.
- Western Christian College High School - closed in 2012.

=== Other schools ===
- Harrow-de Groot School (alternative) - demolished and replaced with The Martha House and houses.
- International Correspondence School
- Maranatha Christian Academy (K-12)
- Normal School – closed in 1944
- Regina Hebrew Academy
