= Mike Strickland =

American gridiron football player (born 1951)

No. 14, 4, 34
- Position: Running back

Personal information
- Born: August 11, 1951 (age 75); Detroit, Michigan, U.S.
- Listed height: 5 ft 8 in (1.73 m)
- Listed weight: 178 lb (81 kg)

Career information
- College: Eastern Michigan
- NFL draft: 1975: 14th round, 363rd overall pick

Career history
- 1975–1977: BC Lions
- 1978–1979: Saskatchewan Roughriders

Awards and highlights
- Eddie James Memorial Trophy (1978); CFL All-Star (1978); 2× CFL West All-Star (1976, 1978)

Mike Strickland (born August 11, 1951) is a former Canadian Football League (CFL) running back. He played for the BC Lions from 1975 through 1977, and for the Saskatchewan Roughriders in 1978 and 1979. He was an All-Star in 1976, and won the Eddie James Memorial Trophy that same season.

Mike has lived in Saskatchewan except for one move to Prince George, British Columbia. He and his wife have two daughters and a granddaughter. Mike has retired from his work at BayerCrop Science.

Mike coached ladies touch football; high school football at Sheldon-Williams Collegiate and F.W. Johnson Collegiate in Regina and North Battleford Comprehensive High School. He has coached with Sask Sport and coached baseball at Robert Usher Collegiate.
