= Stuart Hamilton =

Canadian musician (1929–2017)

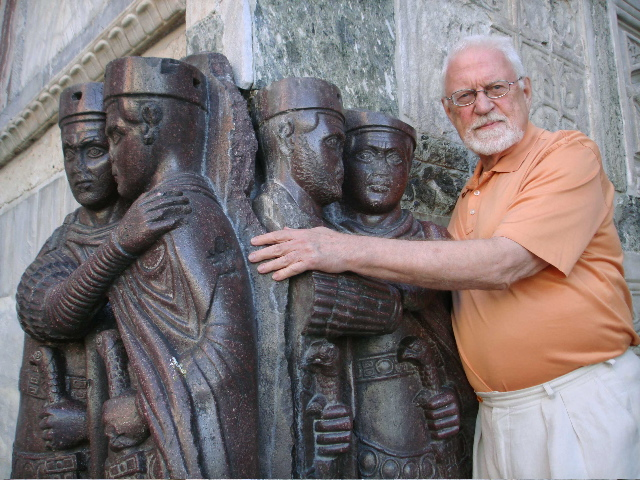
Stuart Hamilton

Robert Stuart Hamilton, CM, Hon. LL.D, A.R.C.T. (September 28, 1929 – January 1, 2017) was an award-winning Canadian accompanist, vocal coach, and opera producer based in Toronto. He was a well-known advocate of post-Baroque French opera. He was recognized nationally for his work as the longtime quiz master for CBC Radio's Saturday Afternoon at the Opera, and taught opera repertoire and diction at the University of Toronto.

As one of Canada's top vocal coaches for over 65 years, he inspired and coached many singers. As a piano accompanist, he performed alongside internationally celebrated artists such as Isabel Bayrakdarian, Mary Lou Fallis, Maureen Forrester, Elizabeth Benson Guy, Ben Heppner, Rosemarie Landry, Richard Margison, Dustin Lee Hiles, Stuart Howe, Lois Marshall, Roxolana Roslak, and Mary Simmons.

== Life and career ==
=== Early life in Regina ===
Born in Regina, Saskatchewan, in the city's General Hospital, Hamilton grew up in a house at 2325 Angus Street near what later became known as "The Crescents" neighbourhood His mother, Florence Hamilton (née Stuart; 1893–1983) was from North Dakota and worked as a nurse (she later remarried under the surname Twiss). His father, James Shire Hamilton (1897-1954), was from Galt, Ontario (now part of Cambridge), and worked as a corporate lawyer. Stuart was their fourth child after Peter, Dorothy and Douglas. A few years later, in 1937, the Hamilton household would welcome another addition, Patricia, known in the family as "Patsy", who would grow up to become a famous Canadian actor of "Anne of Green Gables" fame.

Despite being born at the very beginning of the Great Depression in Canada, in the hardest-hit Prairie Provinces, Hamilton seems to have grown up in relative comfort and happiness. He went to Davin Public Elementary School near his family home. He attended and graduated high school at Regina Collegiate which later renamed Central Collegiate Institute, and is now closed.

His first musical training was in the Lakeview Boys Choir in Regina, under the direction of Kay Hayworth.

While in public school, he also took drama classes with Jean Brown in her private Drama School. His drama coach suggested he favour comedic roles over dramatic leads.

In 1943, at the age of 14, his parents agreed to send him to piano lessons with Martha Somerville Allan. He continued studying with Allan for close to three years.

=== Toronto ===
In 1946, Hamilton's parents moved to Saskatoon. He decided to stay behind to continue his lessons, moving into an apartment with Mrs. Annie Hailstone, a dress-maker. Hamilton moved to Toronto in 1947 to join his sister Dorothy Marshall (née Hamilton), who was already settled in the city and was pursuing her own singing career. He began his piano performance studies at The Royal Conservatory of Music with the Chilean-Canadian composer, pianist, and teacher Alberto Guerrero. Guerrero noted of Hamilton's hands: "...not only were these hands small and stubby but the double-jointed fingers seemed like an insurmountable obstacle." His student nonetheless persevered. He was later diagnosed as having Dupuytren's contracture, eventually resulting in an operation to straighten one of his forefingers. Another forefinger remained bent. Nonetheless, he continued to play piano recreationally and gave a farewell concert on his 85th birthday.

In 1948, to help support his studies, he worked for $2.00 per night as a uniformed usher at Eaton Auditorium, Canada's premier concert stage. This job allowed him to see many performances of The Eaton Auditorium concert series. He also coached singers on the side for twenty-five cents an hour. In 1950 he earned certification as an Associate of The Royal Conservatory of Music (ARCT).

Hamilton spent much of his time in the 1950s involved in the Toronto classical music scene. These seminal years laid much of the ground for his future career in Canadian music. He started frequenting performances and social events of The Royal Conservatory Opera (later known as the Canadian Opera Company) with Herman Geiger-Torel, Nicholas Goldschmidt, and Arnold Walter. After a false start working for Herman Geiger-Torel at the Royal Conservatory Opera School, Hamilton accepted an offer from soprano June Kowalchuck, founder of Hamilton Opera Company, to become their chorus director, rehearsal pianist, and occasional conductor, which he did for a period of five years. His connection to the city of Hamilton was strengthened further when he accepted his first position as a voice teacher at the local Music Conservatory, which required him to spend two full days in the "Steel City" per week. The other days of the week Hamilton spent in Toronto, coaching Elizabeth Benson Guy, Maureen Forrester, and Lois Marshall.

From 1966 onward he performed sporadically on CBC Radio usually as an accompanist. In 1967, at age 38, he took up a significant technical and musical challenge by accepting the role of pianist and singer in a production of Beyond the Fringe, a role made famous in England by Dudley Moore. The show was performed in Buffalo, New York for six weeks, in Toronto for six months, and he later toured across Eastern Canada with a final run in Charlottetown, Prince Edward Island. During afternoons and off days, Hamilton practiced for his 1967 New York City piano recital. Theodore Strongin wrote in the New York Times that his playing "had a poetic feel to it that was beguiling". As a prelude to his second New York recital, he performed the program in Toronto. The Toronto critics were rather unkind. After a second New York recital in 1968, and a third one in London's Wigmore Hall in 1971, Hamilton decided not to further pursue a concert career and concentrated his efforts on the Toronto classical music scene. Canadian Children's Opera Chorus commissioned and performed the Charles Wilson opera The Sleeping Giant. Mr Hamilton played the piano. In winter 1974, he was the music director of an abridged La bohème which ran two months at The Theatre in the Dell in Toronto.

=== Opera in Concert, 1974 ===
In 1974, Hamilton initiated the annual Opera in Concert series at the St. Lawrence Centre for the Arts in Toronto, acting as artistic director, producer, and accompanist. His aim was to use the large pool of talented local singers by offering them opportunities to learn and perform rarely produced works. Normally presenting four operas each season, with the occasional double or triple bill, each opera was performed twice using alternate casts, in concert versions with piano. By 1991 over three hundred singers had presented more than sixty operas, many of which had been given their Canadian or Toronto premières. In 1994 Hamilton stepped down as Artistic Director of Opera in Concert, though he continued his association with the company as artistic advisor and Artistic Director Emeritus.

The operas performed by Opera in Concert under Hamilton's direction have included:

- Thomas' Hamlet (1974, 1977)
- Montemezzi's L'Amore dei Tre Re (1976, 1984)
- Bizet's Djamileh (1976, 1987)
- Verdi's Il Corsaro (1977) and Stiffelio (1978)
- Franz Schmidt's Notre Dame (1978)
- Weinberger's Schwanda the Bagpiper (1979)
- Weber's Der Freischütz (1980, 1990)
- Holst's Savitri (1981)
- D'Albert's Tiefland (1982)
- Rameau's Hippolyte et Aricie and Mercadante's Il Giuramento (1983)
- Saint-Saëns' Henry VIII (1985, 1991),
- Bellini's Il Pirata (1989)
- Rutland Boughton's The Immortal Hour (1991)
- Twelve Massenet operas:
  - Cendrillon (1988),
  - Le Cid (1991),
  - Cléopâtre (1980),
  - Don Quichotte (1978, 1986),
  - Grisélidis (1983, 1991),
  - Hérodiade (1976),
  - Manon (1980),
  - La Navarraise (1981),
  - Sapho (1986),
  - Thaïs (1985),
  - Thérèse (1976, 1981)
  - Werther (1975).

=== Later career ===
Hamilton was also the first Music Director of the Canadian Opera Company Ensemble. One of his duties with the COC Ensemble was as music director of the COC Summer Festival at Harbourfront Centre. In 1981 he relinquished this position, to act as Lois Marshall's accompanist on her farewell recital tour.

In 1977 he alternated with Anna Russell as the Duchess in COC production of Daughter of the Regiment.

Hamilton has two film credits. One was for a cameo role with his sister Patricia Hamilton (credited as "Mme. Selitsky's Accompanist") in the film Anne of Green Gables in 1985. He also appeared in the TV series "A Scattering of Seeds" (as himself) in 2001.

During the 1980s and 1990s, Hamilton was in regular demand as an adjudicator for competitions such as the CBC Young Performers' Competition, Opera America Auditions, the Sullivan Foundation Awards, the Oralia Dominquez Competition (in Mexico), and the George London Foundation Awards.

In 1981, he became the host of the opera quiz on the CBC's Saturday Afternoon at the Opera April–December broadcasts. From 1982 to 2007 Hamilton worked as the Quiz Master on CBC's weekly Saturday Afternoon at the Opera, as well as appearing regularly as a panelist, and occasionally guest quiz master, on the Metropolitan Opera radio broadcasts in New York City. Hamilton's last Opera Quiz for Saturday Afternoon at the Opera was in the fall of 2007.

Hamilton has appeared regularly for the Canadian Opera Company and the Canadian Broadcasting Corporation as lecturer and commentator.

In 2008 Hamilton served as guest judge for Bathroom Divas for seasons 1 and 2.

Hamilton continued to teach opera repertoire and diction at the University of Toronto. He was adjudicator at the Royal Conservatory of Music. He also maintained a full coaching schedule and devoted time to master classes across Canada.

Hamilton's autobiography Opening Windows was published by Dundurn Press in the fall of 2012.

== Awards and recognition ==
- In 1984 Hamilton was made a member of the Order of Canada.
- In 1989 he won the Toronto Arts Award in the Performing Arts Category.
- In 1992 he received the Governor General's Commemorative Medal for the 125th Anniversary of the Confederation of Canada in recognition of significant contributions to performing arts in Canada.
- In 2000 he was awarded the first Ruby award (named for Ruby Mercer) given by Opera Canada Magazine.
- In 2004 he was awarded the Beckmesser Award from the Los Angeles Opera League.
- In 2008 Dalhousie University gave him an honorary doctorate.
- More recently, he has been awarded the Queen Elizabeth II Diamond Jubilee Medal 2012

== Personal life and death ==
Hamilton was known to friends and colleagues by his middle name, Stuart, or by his nickname "Stuartissimo" (a portmanteau of "Stuart" and the musical term "fortissimo").

Hamilton's brother Lieutenant James Douglas Hamilton served in the Canadian Armed Forces in the Korean War and died in action within a month of his deployment. His brother Captain Peter Hamilton worked as a commercial aircraft pilot, and died in the tragic Air Canada Flight 621 crash at Toronto Pearson International Airport in 1970. Stuart's beloved older sister, Dorothy Marshall (née Hamilton) a professional singer in her youth, who worked for the Toronto Public Library later in life, and into her 90s as a volunteer for the Canadian Opera Company Archive Library. Dorothy survived Stuart by a few years, dying on January 25, 2020, at the age of 98.

Hamilton has one living sibling. Patricia Hamilton who recently retired from theatre and television after 12 years at the Shaw Festival. Patricia's son (Hamilton's nephew) is actor Ben Carlson. He has also another surviving nephew (through Dorothy), great-niece, and great-grand niece.

Hamilton identified as gay. "He never doubted or hid his sexual identity, even as a young man in the heteronormative 1950s. 'I've never had the nerve to pretend I wasn't gay,' he wrote in Opening Windows."

After years battling prostate cancer, Hamilton died on January 1, 2017, aged 87.

== Bibliography ==
- Baker, Paul. "Opera in Concert's 25th," Opera Canada, Dec 1998
- Beckwith, John, 'In search of Alberto Guerrero,' Wilfrid Laurier Univ. Press, 2006
- Bogart, Marlene. 'Werther's producer earned the Order of Canada for his contribution to Canadian music,' The Lyric, Spring 1987
- Crory, Neil. 'Something had to be done,' OpCan, vol 25, Spring 1984
- Cummings, David M., International who's who in music and musicians' directory: (in the classical and light classical fields), (Melrose Press:Routledge, 2000), p. 262
- Enright, Jane. 'Stuart Hamilton: unsung opera hero,' Fugue, Aug-Sep 1978
- Ingram, Henry, 'The One and Only STUART HAMILTON', The WholeNote, 25 January 2017
- Kraglund, John. 'Rare fare opens Opera in Concert,' Toronto Globe and Mail, 20 Oct 1983
- Mérinat, Monika, 'Stuart Hamilton: le maître.d'oeuvre d'Opera in concert,' Aria, vol 13, summer 1990.
- Neufeld, James, 'Lois Marshall: A Biography,' Dundurn Press Ltd., 2010
- Scott, Iain. 'Stuart Hamilton: the genius behind Opera in Concert,' OpCan, vol 28, Winter 1987
- "Stuart Hamilton," Opera Canada, fall 2000
