= Pittendrigh =

Pittendrigh is a surname. Notable people with the surname include:

- Barry Pittendrigh, Canadian-American molecular biologist
- Colin Pittendrigh (1918–1996), British biologist
- James Pittendrigh MacGillivray (1856–1938), Scottish sculptor
