= Regina Public Schools =

Public school district of Regina, Saskatchewan, Canada

Regina School Division #4, also known as Regina Public Schools (RPS), is the Anglophone secular public school district of Regina, Saskatchewan, Canada. Its headquarters, J.A. Burnett Education Centre, was named after teacher Jim Burnett.

As of 2020 the school district collects ethnicity data on registration forms, but there is also an anonymous self-reporting Tell Them From Me survey which collects self-reported data. The latter has higher percentages of students with First Nations ancestry declared compared to the former.

In 2021 there was a proposal for diversity training for every person working for the school district. All members of the school board voted in favor to enact this.

== History ==
The headquarters received its current name in 1985.

In 2020 the board had more new members than returning members.

In September 2020 board member Jane Ekong released a report about the experiences of Black Canadian students in the district.

== Schools ==
=== High schools ===
- Balfour Collegiate
- Campbell Collegiate
- F.W. Johnson Collegiate
- Winston Knoll Collegiate
- Martin Collegiate
- Scott Collegiate
- Sheldon-Williams Collegiate
- Thom Collegiate

=== Elementary schools ===
- Albert Community Elementary School
- Arcola Community Elementary School
- Argyle Elementary School
- Henry Braun Elementary School
- Judge Bryant Elementary School
- Ruth M. Buck Elementary School
- Centennial Community Elementary School
- M.J. Coldwell Elementary School
- Connaught Community Elementary School
- Coronation Park Community Elementary School
- The Crescents Elementary School
- Douglas Park Elementary School
- Dr. George Ferguson Elementary School
- W.H. Ford. Elementary School
- Glen Elm Community Elementary School
- Grant Road Elementary School
- Dr. L.M. Hanna Elementary School
- Harbour Landing Elementary School
- W.S. Hawrylak Elementary School
- Wilfred Hunt Elementary School
- Imperial Community Elementary School
- Henry Janzen Elementary School
- Kitchener Community Elementary School
- Lakeview Elementary School
- George Lee Elementary School
- Jack MacKenzie Elementary School
- MacNeill Elementary School
- Massey Elementary School
- McDermid Community Elementary School
- Gladys McDonald Elementary School
- McLurg Elementary School
- Marion McVeety Elementary School
- Ethel Milliken Elementary School
- Elsie Mironuck Community Elementary School
- Ruth Pawson Elementary School
- Dr. A.E. Perry Elementary School
- Plainsview Elementary School
- W.F. Ready Elementary School
- Rosemont Community Elementary School
- Seven Stones Community Elementary School
- Thomson Community Elementary School
- Walker Elementary School
- Wilfrid Walker Elementary School
- Wascana Plains Elementary School

== Former schools ==
- Cochrane High School
- Elsie Dorsey School
- Herchmer School
- Ken Jenkins School - An October 2009 meeting of the RPS board identified it as one of the schools with the smallest number of students, and RPS closed it in 2010. The school was vandalized on multiple occasions, and as of 2020 there are plans to demolish it.
- Stewart Russell School
- Robert Usher Collegiate

== See also ==
- List of schools in Regina, Saskatchewan
