= Tim Kearse =

American football player and coach (born 1959)

No. 1, 10, 85, 88
- Position: Wide receiver

Personal information
- Born: October 24, 1959 (age 67); York, Pennsylvania, U.S.
- Listed height: 5 ft 10 in (1.78 m)
- Listed weight: 186 lb (84 kg)

Career information
- High school: William Penn (York)
- College: San Jose State
- NFL draft: 1983: 11th round, 303rd overall pick

Career history

Playing
- San Diego Chargers (1983)*; BC Lions (1983); Saskatchewan Roughriders (1983–1984); San Diego Chargers (1985)*; Detroit Lions (1986); Indianapolis Colts (1987); Saskatchewan Roughriders (1988)
- * Offseason or practice squad member only

Coaching
- Victoria Rebels (1991–1993) Wide receivers; Balfour Collegiate (1994–1996) Offensive coordinator/assistant head coach; Saskatchewan Roughriders (2001–2006) Wide receivers; Montreal Alouettes (2007) Wide receivers; Hamilton Tiger-Cats (2010–2011) Wide receivers

Awards and highlights
- NCAA Division I-A receptions leader (1981)

Career NFL statistics
- Receptions: 3
- Receiving yards: 56
- Stats at Pro Football Reference

Timothy Allynn Kearse (born October 24, 1959) is an American former professional football player and coach. He played as a wide receiver in the National Football League (NFL) and Canadian Football League (CFL).

Kearse played college football for the San Jose Spartans, leading all of NCAA Division I-A in receptions in 1981. He was selected in the 11th round of the 1983 NFL draft by the San Diego Chargers. Kearse began his professional football career in the Canadian Football League (CFL) with the BC Lions and Saskatchewan Roughriders before making his National Football League (NFL) debut in 1987 with the Indianapolis Colts and concluding his playing career in 1988 with the Roughriders. Afterwards, Kearse coached Canadian football at the high school, semi-pro, and CFL levels in various stints from 1991 to 2011.

== Early life and college ==
Born and raised in York, Pennsylvania, Kearse graduated from William Penn Senior High School. At San Jose State University, he played on the Spartans varsity team from 1980 to 1982 and helped San Jose State win the Pacific Coast Athletic Association title in 1981. In three varsity seasons, Kearse had 152 catches for 2,188 yards and 16 touchdowns. Kearse was an honorable mention All-American in 1981 and 1982.

== Professional playing career ==
In the 1983 NFL draft, Kearse was selected in the 11th round by the San Diego Chargers as the 303rd overall pick. Kearse began his professional football career playing for the BC Lions of the Canadian Football League (CFL) in 1983, where he had two catches for 23 yard. He was traded later that season to the Saskatchewan Roughriders, with whom he had his first pro career touchdowns. With the Roughriders in 1983, Kearse had seven catches for 121 yards and a touchdown, in addition to 15 punt returns for 201 yards and a touchdown. In 1984, Kearse had 19 catches for 240 yards and 11 punt returns for 125 yards and a touchdown with the Roughriders.

Kearse signed with the NFL's Detroit Lions in 1986 but was placed on injured reserve late in the preseason due to a thumb sprain.

In 1987, Kearse made his NFL debut with the Indianapolis Colts as part of a replacement roster that was signed due to a players' strike. He played three games off the bench and made three catches for 56 yards.

Kearse returned to the Roughriders for his final pro football season in 1988. During that season, Kearse had eight receptions for 148 yards and a touchdown.

== Coaching career ==
Kearse remained in Canada for a coaching career after his playing career ended. From 1991 to 1993, Kearse was offensive coordinator and assistant head coach for the Victoria Rebels of the British Columbia Junior Football League. Then from 1994 to 1996, Kearse was an assistant coach for Balfour Collegiate, a high school in Regina, Saskatchewan.

From 2001 to 2006, Kearse was wide receivers coach for the Roughriders, after serving as a guest coach in 2000. In 2007, Kearse was wide receivers coach for the Montreal Alouettes of the CFL. From 2008 to 2009, Kearse was a counselor and teacher at Highwood High School in High River, Alberta. He returned to the CFL in 2010 to be wide receivers coach for the Hamilton Tiger-Cats, a position he would hold through 2011.

Kearse became head trainer at Nextlevel Sports Training after leaving the Tiger-Cats.
