= Winston Knoll Collegiate =

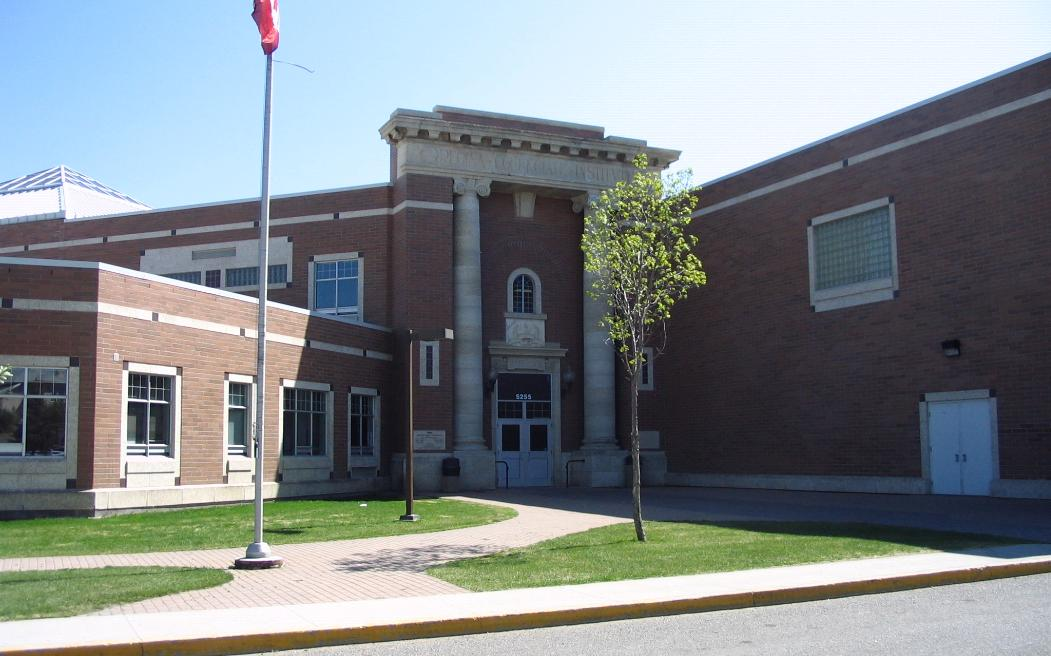

Location
- 5255 Rochdale Boulevard; Regina, Saskatchewan, S4X 4M8; Canada; 50.49543°N 104.65649°W

Information
- School type: High School
- Motto: Where Tradition Meets the Future
- Founded: 1996
- School board: Regina Public School Division
- Principal: Darcy McKeown
- Grades: 9-12
- Enrollment: 855 (2022)
- Language: English, Mandarin
- Area: Regina
- Colours: Green, Blue and Gold
- Mascot: KC the Wolverine (deceased 2004)
- Nickname: Knoll
- Team name: Wolverines
- Website: winstonknollcollegiate.rbe.sk.ca

Winston Knoll Collegiate (WKC) is a public high school located in the Walsh Acres neighbourhood of northwestern Regina, Saskatchewan, Canada. It belongs to the Regina Public Schools division, opening in 1996 to alleviate the student congestion at Thom Collegiate. The school caters to a community of approximately 1100 students. Winston Knoll Collegiate operates on a college system, separating students based on their grade and allotting them a specific group of teachers and classrooms. Technology use was encouraged, until the personal electronics device ban was implemented throughout Saskatchewan. However, enforcement is up to the discretion of each teacher.

The front archway was taken from the former Central Collegiate Institute, the first high school in the city of Regina.

The school has a total of six designated areas called colleges. The colleges are split over two stories. There are colleges A, B, B-west, C, D, E, and F. Each college contains a number of classrooms, totalling five computer labs. The Library is also host to a number of laptops for study purposes.

Winston Knoll Collegiate is wheelchair accessible and has an elevator, as well as a FIAP program. FIAP students help the school by collecting bottles for recycling on Thursdays.

The school also has a successful commercial kitchen which helps trains students into the food industry. The kitchen/cafeteria serves food through its volunteer program.

Current feeder elementary schools include Centennial School, George Lee School, Henry Janzen School, MacNeill School, Plainsview School, and W.H. Ford School.

== Affiliated communities ==
- Normanview West
- Prairie View
- Sherwood/McCarthy
- Twin Lakes
- Walsh Acres
- Westhill
- Lakewood
- Lakeridge

== Notable alumni ==
- Rory Kohlert - professional football player
