= Bathroom Divas =

Canadian reality television series

Bathroom Divas: So You Want to Be an Opera Star? is a Canadian television singing competition, which aired on Bravo! Canada for two seasons in 2006 and 2007. Produced by Kaleidoscope Entertainment and directed by Mike Ward, the series was a competition for amateur opera singers, whose winner got to perform live with the Toronto Symphony Orchestra in a show at Roy Thomson Hall.

The principal judges were Mary Lou Fallis and Tom Diamond, who were joined by Gary Relyea and Michael McMahon in the first season, and Liz Upchurch and Daniel Lichti in the second. Various notable figures in Canadian opera performance and production, including Measha Brueggergosman, Richard Margison, and Stuart Hamilton, also appeared on the program as guest judges.

The first season was won by Elton Lammie, and the second season was won by Elaine Jean Brown. Other competitors were Emili Loisier, Sonja Anderson, Sonja Gustafson, Gail Malcolm and Sergio Restagno in the first season, and Phillip Holmes, Laura Landauer, Robyn Hefferton, Donna Jacobs and Paul Abelha in the second.
