= Frederick Johnson (politician) =

Canadian lawyer, judge, and politician

The Honourable Frederick Johnson OC SOM QC

16th Lieutenant Governor of Saskatchewan
- In office July 6, 1983 – September 7, 1988
- Monarch: Elizabeth II
- Governors General: Edward Schreyer; Jeanne Sauvé
- Premier: Grant Devine
- Preceded by: Irwin McIntosh
- Succeeded by: Sylvia Fedoruk

Personal details
- Born: Frederick William Johnson; February 13, 1917 Dudley, Worcestershire, England
- Died: June 20, 1993 (aged 76) Pasqua Lake, Saskatchewan, Canada
- Party: Liberal
- Spouse: Joyce Laing
- Children: William, Royce, and Sheila
- Education: University of Saskatchewan
- Occupation: Lawyer, judge
- Profession: Politician

Frederick William Johnson OC SOM QC (February 13, 1917 – June 20, 1993) was a Canadian lawyer, judge, and the 16th lieutenant governor of Saskatchewan, from 1983 to 1988.

== Life ==
Born in Dudley, Worcestershire, England, the son of a clergyman, he emigrated to Canada with his family settling in Lipton, Saskatchewan when he was eleven. He taught school in Grenfell before serving as an artillery officer during World War II, achieving the rank of major. After the war, he attended the University of Saskatchewan and received a law degree in 1949. He practised law in Regina and was appointed Queen's Counsel in 1963.

He ran as a Liberal candidate in the 1960 provincial election, losing to Allan Blakeney. In 1962, he ran as a federal Liberal for the electoral district of Regina City, losing to Progressive Conservative Kenneth Hamill More.

He was appointed to the Court of Queen's Bench in 1965 and from 1977 to 1983 served as Chief Justice of that court. From 1983 to 1988 he was the sixteenth Lieutenant-Governor of Saskatchewan and was the first chancellor of the Saskatchewan Order of Merit.

His wife Joyce Johnson was an eminent piano teacher. In 1990, he was made an Officer of the Order of Canada "for his dedication to the arts, education and the environment and for his contribution to Saskatchewan's history and heritage". In 1991 was awarded the Saskatchewan Order of Merit.

== Honorific eponyms ==
Schools

- Saskatchewan: F.W. Johnson Collegiate, Regina
