= Nick Hutchins =

Canadian football player (born 1987)

Profile
- Position: Offensive lineman

Personal information
- Born: August 7, 1987 (age 39); Regina, Saskatchewan, Canada
- Listed height: 6 ft 2 in (1.88 m)
- Listed weight: 315 lb (143 kg)

Career information
- High school: Thom Collegiate
- University: Regina
- CFL draft: 2009: 3rd round, 17th overall pick

Career history
- 2009–2011: Saskatchewan Roughriders
- Stats at CFL.ca (archive)

Nick Hutchins (born August 7, 1987) is a Canadian former professional football offensive lineman who played for the Saskatchewan Roughriders. He was drafted by the Roughriders in the third round of the 2009 CFL draft and signed by the team on May 26, 2009. He played CIS football for the Regina Rams, and played his high school football at Thom Collegiate in Regina.
