= Joel Lipinski =

Canadian football player (born 1985)

Profile
- Position: Defensive back

Personal information
- Born: July 29, 1985 (age 41); Regina, Saskatchewan, Canada
- Listed height: 5 ft 10 in (1.78 m)
- Listed weight: 196 lb (89 kg)

Career information
- High school: Campbell
- CJFL: Vancouver Island Raiders
- University: Saint Mary's; Regina
- CFL draft: 2009: undrafted

Career history
- 2009: Saskatchewan Roughriders
- 2011: Edmonton Eskimos*
- * Offseason or practice squad member only
- Stats at CFL.ca

Joel Lipinski
Medal record

Men's American football

Representing Canada

World Championship
Silver medal – second place	2011 Austria	Team competition

Joel Lipinski (born July 29, 1985) is a Canadian former professional football defensive back who played in the Canadian Football League. He was signed as an undrafted free agent by the Saskatchewan Roughriders in 2009.

Lipinski played CIS football for the Saint Mary's Huskies and Regina Rams and CJFL football for the Vancouver Island Raiders.

In 2016 Lipinski was named strength and conditioning coach to the Canada national football team.
