= Neal Hughes =

Canadian football player (born 1980)

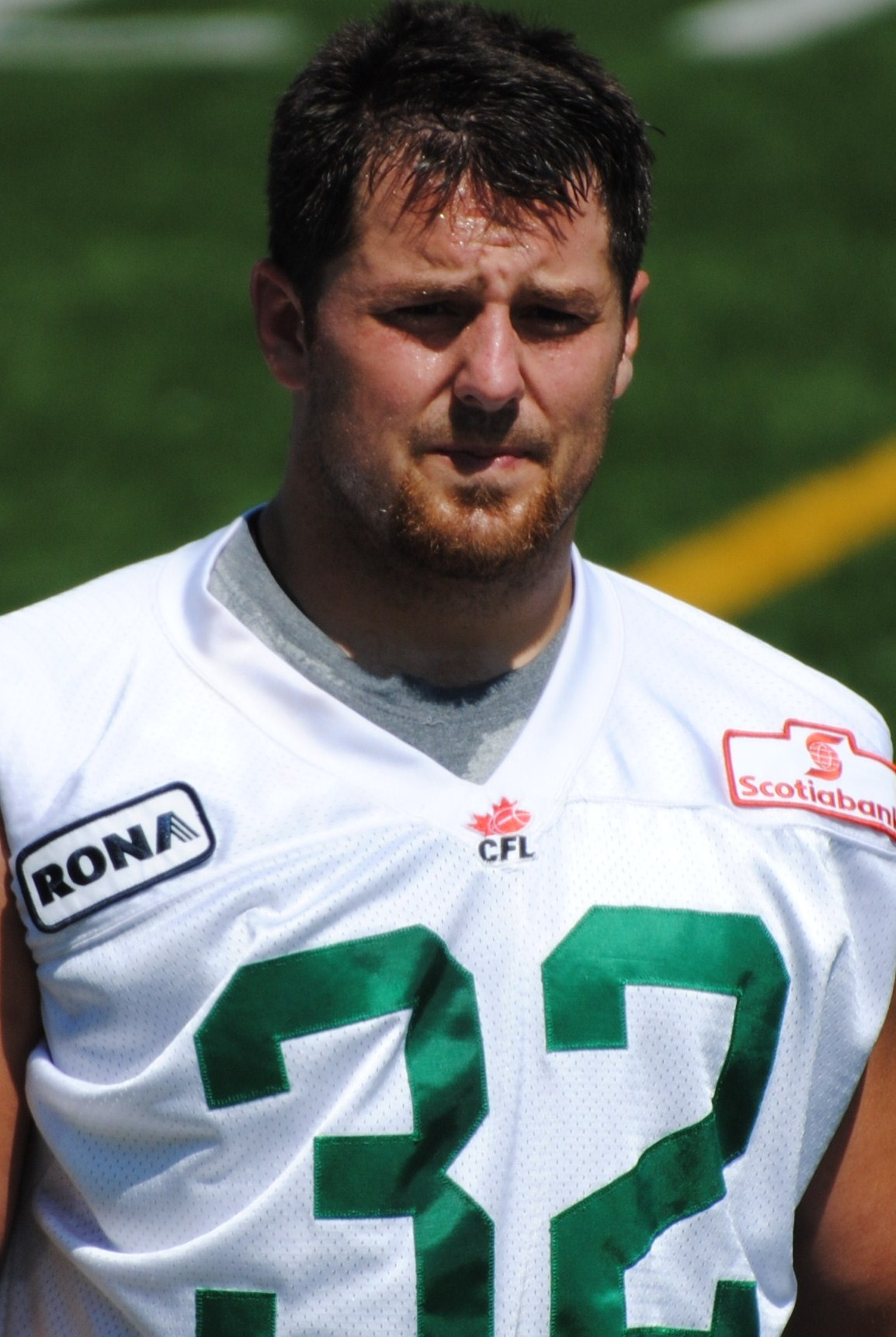
- Hughes with the Saskatchewan Roughriders in 2010

No. 32
- Position: Fullback

Personal information
- Born: July 2, 1980 (age 46); Regina, Saskatchewan, Canada
- Listed height: 5 ft 10 in (1.78 m)
- Listed weight: 208 lb (94 kg)

Career information
- High school: Thom Collegiate
- University: Regina

Career history
- 2004–2014: Saskatchewan Roughriders

Awards and highlights
- 2× Grey Cup champion (2007, 2013)
- Stats at CFL.ca (archive)

Neal Hughes (born July 2, 1980) is a Canadian former professional football player for the Saskatchewan Roughriders of the Canadian Football League (CFL). Hughes, who is of Métis heritage, signed with the Riders as a free agent after completing his university career with the Regina Rams.

== Early life ==
Hughes was born and raised in Regina, and has played all of his football in the city, starting out in the Regina Minor Football (RMF) system at the age of 7. He played peewee and midget, moving up to the Thom Collegiate Trojans for his high school football career. During his career with the Rams, he was named the university's Male Athlete of the Year in 2003.

== Saskatchewan Roughriders ==
After an outstanding collegiate career, Hughes signed a free agent contract with the Saskatchewan Roughriders in April 2004. Under head coach Danny Barrett, he spent much of his time as backup fullback to Chris Szarka, while also playing on special teams. He had his first reception against Winnipeg in the Banjo Bowl in 2007 and had his first carry on October 21, 2007 against the Hamilton Tiger-Cats and scored his first CFL touchdown five days later against the Edmonton Eskimos on a four-yard run. He also added a receiving touchdown in the West Final playoff game against the BC Lions.

In 2008, Hughes enjoyed a breakout season recording 35 carries for 130 yards and four touchdowns and 16 receptions for 187 yards and three touchdowns. His seven touchdowns was only second on the team behind Wes Cates, despite playing in only 12 games due to a leg injury that took him out of most of August and September. Hughes also led the team in special teams tackles, with 21 to his credit. Due to a nagging knee injury, Hughes sat out for 11 games in 2009 and saw a diminished role in the offense, seeing his first touch of the season in the second-to-last regular season game.

Hughes had a personal web site. He announced his retirement on May 20, 2015.

Hughes was inducted into the Roughriders' Plaza of Honour.
