= Kennedy Nkeyasen =

Ghanaian-Canadian football player (born 1976)

Profile
- Position: Safety

Personal information
- Born: April 7, 1976 (age 50); Tamale, Ghana
- Listed height: 5 ft 9 in (1.75 m)
- Listed weight: 193 lb (88 kg)

Career information
- College: Idaho State
- CFL draft: 1999: 3rd round, 18th overall pick

Career history
- 1999–2007: Saskatchewan Roughriders
- Stats at CFL.ca (archive)

Kennedy Nkeyasen (born April 7, 1976) is a former free safety (converted from running back) who played for the Saskatchewan Roughriders of the Canadian Football League.

Nkeyasen was drafted out of college by Saskatchewan (18th overall) in 1999. The CFL awarded him non-import status because he played his high school football at Thom Collegiate in Regina, Saskatchewan, Canada. He attended college at Idaho State University.

Nkeyasen missed most of the 2007 CFL season due to an achilles tendon injury suffered in a pre-season game.

In June 2008, Kennedy accepted a Public Relations position with the Saskatchewan Roughriders.
