= Marc Mueller =

Canadian gridiron football coach (born 1989)

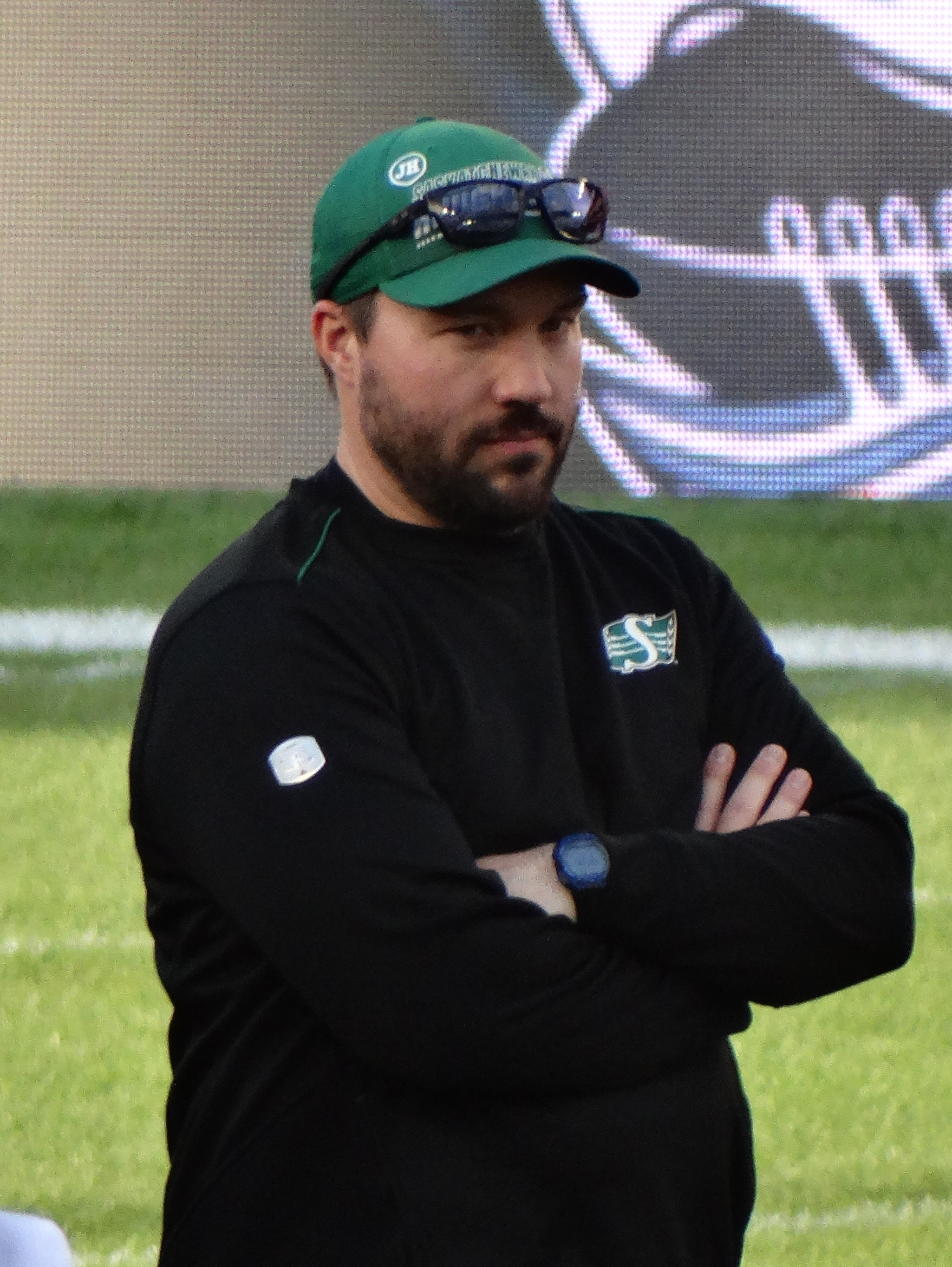
- Mueller with the Saskatchewan Roughriders in 2024

Saskatchewan Roughriders
- Title: Offensive coordinator

Personal information
- Born: April 15, 1989 (age 37); Regina, Saskatchewan, Canada
- Listed height: 6 ft 0 in (1.83 m)
- Listed weight: 200 lb (91 kg)

Career information
- Position: Quarterback
- High school: Sheldon-Williams (Regina)
- University: Regina
- CFL draft: 2011: undrafted

Career history

Playing
- 2011: Edmonton Eskimos*
- * Offseason or practice squad member only

Coaching
- 2013: Regina Rams (Quarterbacks coach)
- 2014: Calgary Stampeders (Defensive assistant)
- 2015–2019: Calgary Stampeders (Running backs coach)
- 2020: Calgary Stampeders (Quarterbacks coach)
- 2021: Calgary Stampeders (Quarterbacks coach and running backs coach)
- 2022–2023: Calgary Stampeders (Quarterbacks coach)
- 2024–present: Saskatchewan Roughriders (Offensive coordinator)

Awards and highlights
- 3× Grey Cup champion (2014, 2018, 2025)

Marc Mueller (born April 15, 1989) is the offensive coordinator for the Saskatchewan Roughriders of the Canadian Football League (CFL). He is a two-time Grey Cup champion as an assistant coach with the Calgary Stampeders. In university, he played quarterback for the Regina Rams of the CIS from 2007 to 2012.

== Early life ==
Mueller was born and raised in Regina, Saskatchewan. He is the grandson of Ron Lancaster. Lancaster was the head coach of the Edmonton Eskimos from 1991 to 1997 when Mueller was a child. Mueller says that a lot of his earliest football memories are in Edmonton's Commonwealth Stadium locker room with his grandfather.

Mueller played Regina Minor Football, then played high school football in Regina. In 2006, he quarterbacked Regina's Sheldon-Williams Spartans to the Saskatchewan 4A high school city and provincial championship.

== Early university career ==
==== 2007 ====
Mueller joined his hometown University of Regina Rams for the 2007 season. He dressed for all eight regular season games and both playoff games as the team's second-string quarterback behind Teale Orban.

==== 2008 ====
During the 2008 season, Mueller dressed for all eight regular season games and the team's Canada West semifinal game at Calgary as a backup quarterback. This was Orban's last year of eligibility playing university football.

==== 2009 ====
Mueller took over as the Rams' starting quarterback for the 2009 season, and started all eight of the team's regular season games and the team's one playoff game. That year, he set a Rams single-season record with 310 pass attempts, also led the Canada West Conference in pass completions (176) and yards (2308). Mueller threw for a Rams postseason record with 470 passing yards in the team's Canada West semifinal game at Saskatchewan on November 7.

==== 2010 ====
In 2010, Mueller once again started all eight of the Rams regular season games and the team's one playoff game. He set a Ram single-season record in pass completions (182) and led the conference in passing yards (2437). Mueller was named the Canada West Offensive Player of the Week after throwing two touchdown passes and rushing for two more in a 40-8 win over Alberta on October 2.

== Professional career ==
Mueller signed as an undrafted free agent with the Edmonton Eskimos of the CFL on May 9, 2011, following the 2011 CFL draft. A number of Edmonton's 2011 coaches had been affiliated with the franchise in the 1990s when Lancaster was the team's head coach and Mueller was a child: Kavis Reed, head coach who had played under Lancaster from 1995 to 1997; Marcus Crandell, offensive coordinator who had been an Edmonton quarterback in 1997; Rich Stubler, defensive coordinator who had been a defensive coach under Lancaster from 1991 to 1995, including the 1993 Grey Cup season; and Mark Nelson, linebackers coach who had been an assistant coach on the 1993 team as well.

Mueller saw game action in Edmonton's first preseason game, a game played at Taylor Field in Regina against his hometown team, the Saskatchewan Roughriders. In that game, Mueller was 3 for 3 passing for 45 yards. He was released on June 20, 2011 and returned to the Rams.

== Later university career ==
==== 2011 ====
Back with the Rams, Mueller's 2011 season was cut short when he suffered a season-ending injury on the team's second play from scrimmage against UBC on September 2. Because of his injury, he was granted a medical redshirt.

==== 2012 ====
In 2012, Mueller started six regular season and both playoff games at quarterback for the Rams. He engineered a game-winning touchdown drive against Manitoba that spanned nine plays and 95 yards. He was injured at the beginning of that drive and missed the team's next two games. In the Rams' Canada West Semifinal win on November 2 against Saskatchewan, Mueller was named the Canada West and CIS Offensive Player of the Week after completing 21 of 32 passes for 393 yards and three touchdowns.

Mueller finished his career as the Rams' all-time leader in pass completion rate (62.1%), second on the team's all-time list in career pass completions (511) and passing yards (6522), and third in touchdown passes (34).

== Coaching career ==
=== Regina Rams ===
In 2013, after completing his Regina Rams playing eligibility, Mueller joined the team as quarterbacks coach.

=== Calgary Stampeders ===
==== 2014 ====
On February 18, 2014, Mueller was named a defensive assistant coach for the Calgary Stampeders. Rich Stubler, Calgary's new defensive coordinator, had known Mueller since Stubler's time working with Lancaster in the 1990s with the Edmonton Eskimos, as well as when Mueller tried out for Edmonton in 2011. Mueller worked closely with the linebackers, including Juwan Simpson and Deron Mayo, who ranked second and third on the team in tackles with 74 and 67, respectively. Calgary finished the regular season with a league-best 15-3 record, and defeated Edmonton in the West Final 43-18. Mueller earned his first Grey Cup when Calgary won 20-16 over the Hamilton Tiger-Cats.

==== 2015 ====
In 2015, Mueller moved to the offensive side of the ball when he became the Stampeders' running backs coach. Calgary's running back was Jon Cornish, a former winner of the CFL's Most Outstanding Canadian and Most Outstanding Player awards. Due to injuries to Cornish, the Stampeders acquired Jerome Messam from the Saskatchewan Roughriders, who had already been eliminated from the playoffs. Messam started the final two games of the season for the Stampeders, recording 28 carries for 180 yards.

Calgary finished tied for the top record in the CFL with Edmonton (14-4), but Edmonton clinched first place in the West by winning their 3-game season series 2-1. Calgary defeated BC 35-9 in the West Semi-Final, but Calgary fell to Edmonton in the West Final 45-31.

==== 2016 ====
In 2016, Mueller continued as the Stampeders' running backs coach under the team's new head coach, Dave Dickenson. Cornish retired during the following off-season, paving the way for Messam to become the team's full-time starter. As the new full-time starter for the Stampeders, Messam had a career year. For the first time in his career, he played in all 18 regular season games and set career highs in carries (206), rushing yards (1,198), touchdowns (11), and receptions (54). He also won the award for Most Outstanding Canadian, for the second time in his career.

Calgary finished first overall in the CFL with a 15-2-1 record, which included the CFL record for the longest winning streak within one season (14). Calgary beat BC 42-15 in the West Final. In the Grey Cup, Messam caught a 7 yard touchdown pass from Bo Levi Mitchell in the first quarter. Calgary lost in overtime to Ottawa 39-33.

==== 2017 ====
In 2017, Mueller continued as the Stampeders' running backs coach. Messam finished third in rushing yards with 1,016 (trailing Andrew Harris and William Powell) on 215 carries with nine touchdowns.

Calgary finished 13-4-1, once again first overall in the CFL. Calgary defeated the Edmonton Eskimos in the West Final 32-28. Calgary fell to Toronto Argonauts in the Grey Cup 27-24, a game in which Messam scored a rushing touchdown and a receiving touchdown from Mitchell. For his efforts, Messam received the Dick Suderman Trophy as the game's most valuable Canadian.

==== 2018 ====
In 2018, Mueller continued as the Stampeders' running backs coach. Calgary finished first overall in the CFL with a 13-5 record, defeated the Winnipeg Blue Bombers in the West Final 22-14, and the Ottawa Redblacks in the Grey Cup 27-16. In the Grey Cup game, running back Don Jackson scored the first points of the game when he caught a 21 yard touchdown pass from Mitchell.

==== 2019 ====
In 2019, Mueller continued as the Stampeders' running backs coach.

Calgary finished second in the West with a 12-6 record. The team lost to Winnipeg in the West Semi-Final 35-14.

==== 2020 ====
On January 16, 2020, Mueller was named the quarterbacks coach for the Stampeders. The season was cancelled due to the COVID-19 pandemic.

==== 2021 ====
In 2021, Mueller held the titles of quarterbacks and running backs coach for the Stampeders.

From a quarterback perspective, Mitchell was the starting quarterback at the beginning of the season. However, he was injured in week 1 and played through the injury in week 2, and was placed on the 6-game injured list. Jake Maier started in Mitchell's place. In Maier's second start, he set a Stampeder franchise record by completing 17 consecutive passes. In Maier's third start, he became the first quarterback in Canadian Football League history to throw for over 300 passing yards in each of his first three career starts. Maier also came off the bench in Calgary's final game of the regular season, against Winnipeg, and engineered a comeback victory in the fourth quarter.

From a running back perspective, Ka'Deem Carey led the Stampeders in rushing with 869 yards and 7 touchdowns.

The Stampeders finished third in the West with an 8-6 record, and fell to Saskatchewan in overtime 33-30 in the West Semi-Final. In this game, Carey rushed for 117 yards and 2 touchdowns.

==== 2022 ====
In 2022, Mueller continued as the Stampeders' quarterbacks coach.

In Week 1, Calgary was playing against Montreal. In this game, Maier replaced Mitchell, who was limping slightly as he headed to the sidelines in the fourth quarter. Maier was able to lead Calgary to a fourth quarter victory. In Week 11, Maier replaced Mitchell in the second half and led the Stamps to victory over the Toronto Argonauts. Maier was named the starting quarterback the following week, and he continued to be the starter late into the season.

The Stampeders finished tied for second place in the West Division with BC, but BC finished second due to winning their 3 game season series 2-1. BC beat Calgary in the West Semi-Final 30-16.

After the season, Mueller was interviewed for the position of offensive coordinator with the Saskatchewan Roughriders, but decided to stay with the Stampeders.

==== 2023 ====
In 2023, Mueller continued as the Stampeders' quarterbacks coach.

Mitchell was traded to Hamilton, and Jake Maier became Calgary's undisputed starting quarterback. Maier was the only CFL quarterback to play in all 18 regular-season games. He gained 4,244 yards passing, which was third in the league.

The Stampeders finished third in the West. Calgary lost to BC in the West Semi-Final 41-30.

=== Saskatchewan Roughriders ===
On November 30, 2023, the Saskatchewan Roughriders announced that Corey Mace had been hired as the team's new head coach. Mueller had worked with Mace in Calgary from 2014 to 2021. Mace was a defensive lineman in 2014 when Mueller was Calgary's defensive assistant coach, and the two were position coaches on the Stampeders' coaching staff from 2016 to 2021.

On December 6, 2023, it was announced that Mueller had been hired as the offensive coordinator of the Saskatchewan Roughriders, to a two-year term.

==== 2024 ====
In 2024, quarterback Trevor Harris was nominated to the Western All-CFL team. Receiver Samuel Emilus was nominated as the Roughriders' top Canadian, and to the Western All-CFL team. Logan Ferland was nominated as the team's top offensive lineman, to the Western All-CFL and All-CFL teams, and the DeMarco-Becket Memorial Trophy winner as Most Outstanding Offensive Lineman in the West Division. Offensive lineman Trevor Reid was nominated as the team's top rookie.

The Roughriders finished 9-8-1, second in the West Division. They defeated the B.C. Lions 28-19 in the West Semi-Final, but were defeated 38-22 by the Winnipeg Blue Bombers in the West Final.

==== 2025 ====
In 2025, Jermarcus Hardrick won the DeMarco-Becket Memorial Trophy and the CFL's Most Outstanding Offensive Lineman Award.

The Roughriders finished 12-6, the top record in the CFL. They hosted the B.C. Lions in the West Final. With 1:03 remaining in the fourth quarter, the Roughriders offence generated a 76 yard drive, which culminated with a 3 yard touchdown pass from Harris to Tommy Nield. Saskatchewan won 24-21. In the Grey Cup game, the Roughriders defeated the Montreal Alouettes 25-17. Harris was the Most Valuable Player and Emilus was the Most Valuable Canadian.

==== 2026 ====
In 2026, Harris led the CFL in passing yards, and KeeSean Johnson led the West Division in receptions and receiving yards.

The Roughriders finished 10-8, third place in the West Division. In the West Semi-Final, they were defeated by the hometown B.C. Lions 33-26.

== Personal life ==
Mueller's grandfather is former CFL quarterback, coach, and broadcaster, Ron Lancaster. Mueller's father is Larry Mueller, a former Assistant General Manager for the Roughriders. Marc Mueller's uncles are former Canadian football coach Ron "R. D." Lancaster Jr., and football coach and former quarterback with the University of Alberta Golden Bears, Bob Lancaster.
