= Jon Ryan =

Canadian gridiron football player (born 1981)

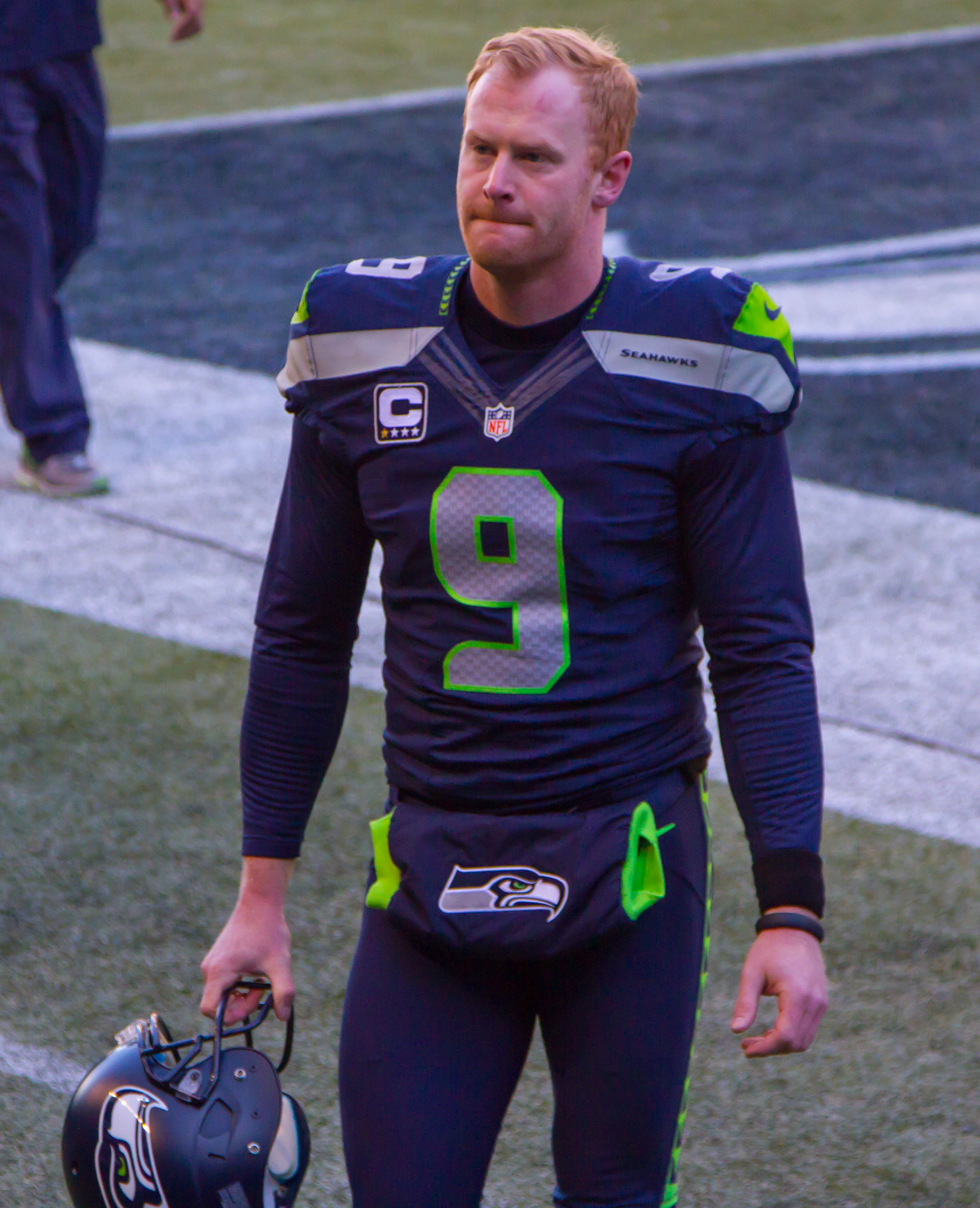
- Ryan with the Seattle Seahawks in 2014

No. 14, 9, 12
- Position: Punter

Personal information
- Born: November 26, 1981 (age 44); Regina, Saskatchewan, Canada
- Listed height: 6 ft 0 in (1.83 m)
- Listed weight: 217 lb (98 kg)

Career information
- High school: Sheldon-Williams Collegiate (Regina, Saskatchewan)
- University: Regina (2000–2003)
- CFL draft: 2004: 3rd round, 24th overall pick

Career history
- Winnipeg Blue Bombers (2004–2005); Green Bay Packers (2006–2007); Seattle Seahawks (2008–2017); Buffalo Bills (2018)*; Saskatchewan Roughriders (2019–2021); Hamilton Tiger-Cats (2022)*; Edmonton Elks (2022)
- * Offseason or practice squad member only

Awards and highlights
- Super Bowl champion (XLVIII); Seattle Seahawks Top 50 players; CFL All-Star (2005); 2× CFL West All-Star (2005, 2019)

Career CFL statistics
- Punts: 914
- Punting yards: 40,883
- Punting average: 44.7
- Longest punt: 77
- Inside 20: 311
- Stats at Pro Football Reference
- Stats at CFL.ca

Jonathan Robert Ryan (born November 26, 1981) is a Canadian former professional football player who was a punter in the Canadian Football League (CFL) and National Football League (NFL). He played university football for the Regina Rams, and began his professional career in the CFL with the Winnipeg Blue Bombers after being selected in the 2004 CFL draft. He also played in the NFL for the Green Bay Packers and was a member of the Seattle Seahawks for ten seasons.

On April 8, 2025, Ryan was announced as an inductee to the Saskatchewan Sports Hall of Fame Class of 2025 He is the first Saskatchewan player to win a Super Bowl.

== Early life ==
Ryan was born and raised in Regina, Saskatchewan. On Halloween when he was 8 years old, he dressed up as a punter. He attended Sheldon-Williams Collegiate for high school, where he played as running back, placekicker and punter on the school's football team.

Ryan was a member of the Sheldon-Williams team that defeated the Evan Hardy Souls 41–7 to capture the 1999 Saskatchewan High School provincial championship. Ryan and Evan Hardy running back Jeff Piercy would both go on to play in the CFL in the years following that game.

He then attended the University of Regina, where he played both punter and wide receiver for the Regina Rams football team from 2000 to 2003. During his second season with the Rams, he caught a 109-yard touchdown pass, and led the team in receiving, in addition to his kicking duties. After his fourth year with the Rams, Ryan picked up several team awards, including Best Special Teams Player, Top Scorer and Most Valuable Player. He was also named a first-team Canada West All-Star, and a CIS All-Star. Ryan also ran track for the University of Regina.

== Professional career ==
=== Winnipeg Blue Bombers ===
In 2004, the Winnipeg Blue Bombers of the Canadian Football League (CFL) selected Ryan as a punter and wide receiver in the third round of Canadian College Draft, making him the 24th overall pick. Ryan joined the Blue Bombers for the 2004 CFL Season. During his rookie season, Ryan finished second in punting average to Noel Prefontaine of the Toronto Argonauts.

During the 2005 season, Ryan led the league with a 50.6 yard average, while punting the most out of all league punters, 118 times. NFL talk buzzed around Ryan's future, while midway through the year, there was also speculation that Ryan may take over the kicking duties as well from aging veteran Troy Westwood.

=== Green Bay Packers ===
==== 2006 season ====
On February 7, 2006, Ryan signed with the Green Bay Packers to a three-year $965,000 contract. He was only the third Saskatchewan native to make it to the NFL, following Arnie Weinmeister and Rueben Mayes.

During training camp in 2006 he found out his father, Bob, was diagnosed with terminal cancer and he persevered through a tough season, which included punting in a game two days after his father's death. His teammates voted him as the recipient of the Ed Block Courage Award in 2006 for his display of courage and sportsmanship, and for being an inspiration in the locker room. On September 10, he made his NFL debut against the Chicago Bears. In the 26–0 loss, he finished with six punts for 270 net yards for a 45.00 average. Overall, in the 2006 season, he finished with 84 punts for 3,739 net yards for a 44.51 average.

==== 2007 season ====
Ryan (9) with the Green Bay Packers in 2007

On September 30, 2007, against the Minnesota Vikings he became the first Packers punter to rush for a first down since David Beverly did so against the Houston Oilers on December 14, 1980. His rush attempt that resulted in a gain of 7 yards came on a fake punt that was originally intended to be a pass, however, he did not hear the coaches call it off at the last minute. He ran with the ball when he realized he had no one to throw to and ran into several of his blockers in the process because they did not know he was running with the ball.

On December 23, 2007, Ryan had two of his punts blocked by the Chicago Bears, including one that was returned for a touchdown. He also had a nine-yard punt during the game and bobbled a snap on another that lead to a turnover on downs. Before this, the Packers went 929 punts without a blocked punt, dating back to September 11, 1995. The next week, during a 34–13 victory over the Detroit Lions, Ryan kicked a 72-yard punt in the fourth quarter, the longest punt at Lambeau Field since Don Chandler's 90 yard punt in 1965. The punt tied for the second longest in franchise history - set by Sean Landeta September 20, 1998, at Cincinnati.

During the 2007 season, Ryan posted a net average of 37.6 yards, 12th in the NFL and the highest in Green Bay since 1969. His gross mark of 44.4 was the fourth-best in club history.

Ryan was released by the Packers on September 1, 2008.

=== Seattle Seahawks ===
==== 2008 season ====
Following Week 1 of the 2008 regular season, Ryan signed with the Seattle Seahawks on September 9 to a two-year $980,000 contract. In Week 8 against the San Francisco 49ers, he kicked a 63-yard punt, a 60-yard punt and a 55-yard punt. He finished the 2008 season with 78 punts averaging 45.6 yards.

==== 2009 season ====
In his Week 6 game of the 2009 NFL season, he threw a 42-yard pass against the Arizona Cardinals to garner a 118.7 QB rating for the season. Overall, in the 2009 season, he finished with 88 punts for 4,068 net yards for a 46.23 average.

After the season ended, Ryan signed a six-year, $9.1 million contract with $1.9 million guaranteed and $1.6 million in signing bonus.

==== 2010 season ====
On October 17, in a game against the Chicago Bears, Ryan was hit by Earl Bennett while trying to make a tackle on Devin Hester's 89-yard punt return for a touchdown. Ryan's ribs were injured, but not fractured.

Ryan played in the final game of the 2010 regular season against the St. Louis Rams and landed a punt on the two-yard line on the fly towards the end of the first quarter. Later, in the fourth quarter, he pinned the Rams inside of their own 10-yard line again, this time kicking it down to the seven-yard line. His efforts helped the Seahawks secure the final playoff spot remaining in the 2010 NFL season. He won NFC Special Teams Player of the Week. This marked the first time that a team with a losing record (7–9) has made the NFL playoffs as a Division Champion (NFC West). Overall, in the 2010 season, he finished with 78 punts for 3,254 net yards for a 41.72 average.

==== 2011 season ====
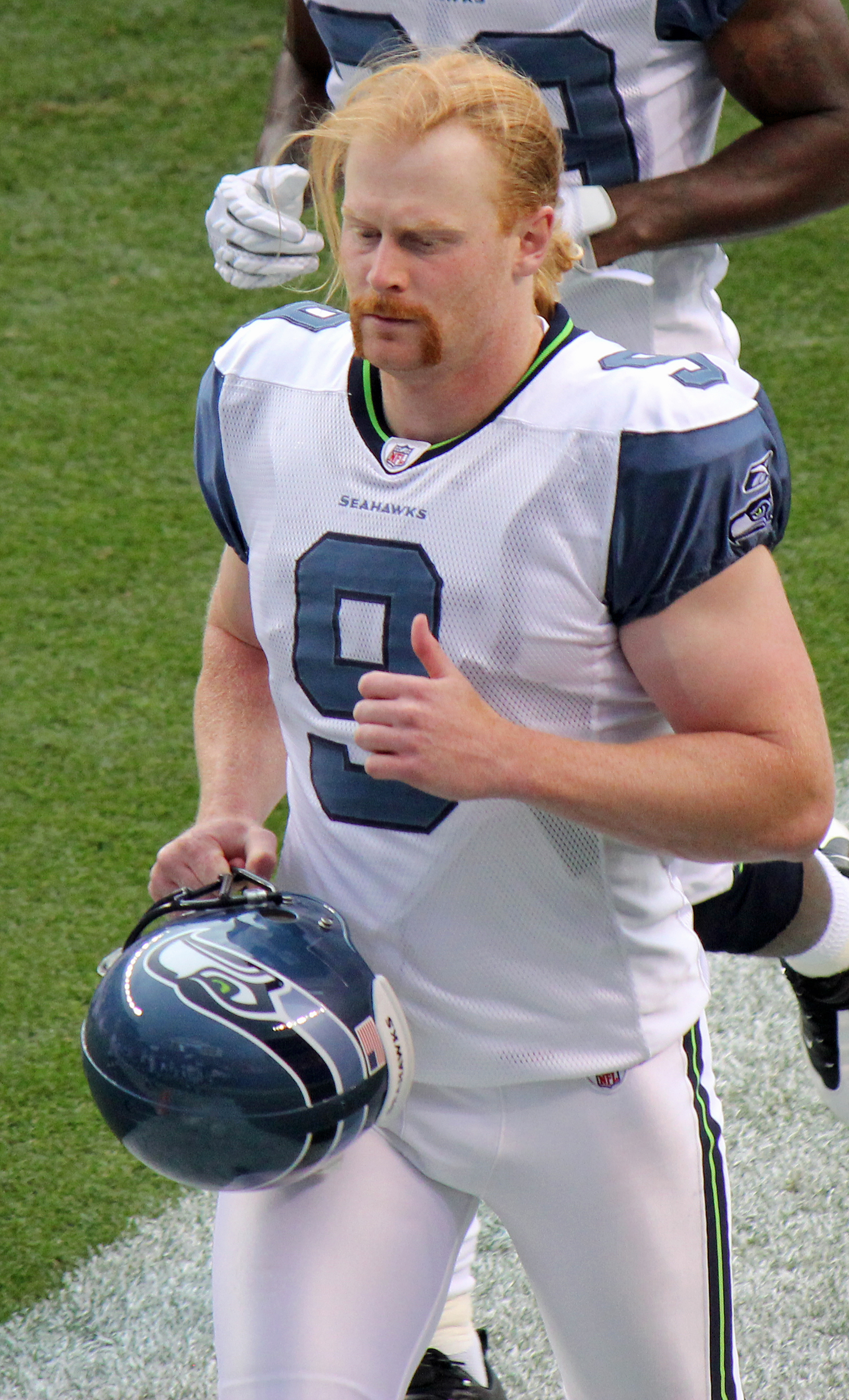
Ryan with the Seattle Seahawks in 2011

Overall, in the 2011 season, Ryan finished with 95 punts for 4,391 net yards for a 46.22 average.

==== 2012 season ====
Overall, in the 2012 season, Ryan finished with 65 punts for 2,963 net yards for a 45.58 average.

==== 2013 season ====
In the 2013 season, Ryan finished with 74 punts for 3,159 net yards for a 42.69 average.

On February 2, 2014, Ryan became the first player from Saskatchewan to win the Super Bowl when the Seahawks defeated the Denver Broncos 43–8 in Super Bowl XLVIII.

==== 2014 season ====
Ryan won NFC Special Teams Player of the Month for September. In the 2014 season, Ryan finished with 61 punts for 2,688 net yards for a 44.07 average.

In the third quarter of the NFC Championship, in which the Seahawks were trailing 16–0, Ryan threw a 19-yard touchdown pass to Garry Gilliam on a fake field goal. He is the first punter to throw a touchdown pass in an NFL playoff game and the first Canadian to throw a touchdown in any NFL game since quarterback Mark Rypien in 1993. The Seahawks ultimately won the NFC Championship by a score of 28–22 and advanced to their second straight Super Bowl. In Super Bowl XLIX, Ryan finished with six punts for 269 net yards for a 42.33 average.

==== 2015 season ====
In the 2015 season, Ryan finished with 68 punts for 3,105 net yards for a 45.66 average.

==== 2016 season ====
On March 11, 2016, he signed a four-year $10 million contract to stay with the Seattle Seahawks.

In Week 4, Ryan won NFC Special Teams Player of the Week. In Week 15, against the Los Angeles Rams, Ryan rushed for 26 yards and a first down on a fake play but was injured on the play. Overall, in the 2016 season, he finished with 71 punts for 3,126 net yards for a 44.03 average.

==== 2017 season ====
Overall, in the 2017 season, Ryan finished with 92 punts for 4,141 net yards for a 45.01 average.

On August 20, 2018, Ryan was released by the Seahawks after 10 seasons with the team, after Michael Dickson beat him out in the preseason. At the time of his departure Ryan was the longest-tenured Seahawk on the current roster.

=== Buffalo Bills ===
On August 21, 2018, Ryan signed with the Buffalo Bills, briefly reuniting him with former Seahawks placekicker Stephen Hauschka. He was released on September 1, 2018.

=== Saskatchewan Roughriders ===
After sitting out the 2018 season, Ryan signed with his hometown Saskatchewan Roughriders to a one-year contract on May 14, 2019. Ryan's booming leg would often flip field position; he also scored 12 rouges on the year, and even completed a pass on a fake punt, but the play was called back by a penalty. Ryan was named the team's Most Outstanding Special Teams player for the year.

After the CFL canceled the 2020 season due to the COVID-19 pandemic, Ryan chose to opt-out of his contract with the Roughriders on August 25, 2020. He re-signed with the Roughriders on February 10, 2021.

=== Hamilton Tiger-Cats ===
On July 10, 2022, it was announced that Ryan had signed with the Hamilton Tiger-Cats. He did not make an appearance for the Tiger-Cats.

=== Edmonton Elks ===
On July 26, 2022, it was announced that Ryan had been traded to the Edmonton Elks in exchange for an eighth-round pick. Ryan announced his retirement at the end of the Elks' 2022 season.

==== Retirement ====
On April 16, 2024, Ryan signed a one-day contract to retire with the Seahawks team.

== NFL career statistics ==
Legend
	Led the league
	Won the Super Bowl
**Bold**	Career high

=== Regular season ===
Year	Team	Punting									
Year	Team	GP	Punts	Yds	Net Yds	Lng	Avg	Net Avg	Blk	Ins20	TB
2006	GNB	**16**	84	3,739	2,996	66	44.5	35.7	0	17	**12**
2007	GNB	**16**	60	2,664	2,331	72	44.4	37.6	**2**	18	11
2008	SEA	15	78	3,557	2,993	63	45.6	37.9	1	22	**12**
2009	SEA	**16**	88	4,068	3,409	70	46.2	38.7	0	28	9
2010	SEA	**16**	78	3,254	2,907	63	41.7	37.3	0	27	1
2011	SEA	**16**	**95**	**4,431**	**3,730**	**77**	**46.6**	39.3	0	**34**	8
2012	SEA	**16**	65	2,963	2,651	73	45.6	**40.8**	0	30	3
2013	SEA	**16**	74	3,159	2,977	69	42.7	39.2	**2**	28	5
2014	SEA	**16**	61	2,688	2,373	66	44.1	38.3	1	28	6
2015	SEA	**16**	68	3,093	2,579	73	45.5	37.9	0	24	7
2016	SEA	**16**	71	3,126	2,830	64	44.0	39.3	1	26	3
2017	SEA	**16**	92	4,141	3,569	74	45.0	38.8	0	29	6
Career		191	914	40,883	35,345	77	44.7	38.4	7	311	83

=== Playoffs ===
Year	Team	Punting									
Year	Team	GP	Punts	Yds	Net Yds	Lng	Avg	Net Avg	Blk	Ins20	TB
2007	GNB	2	9	298	254	43	33.1	28.2	0	3	**1**
2010	SEA	2	13	470	429	52	36.2	33.0	0	4	0
2012	SEA	2	6	214	182	50	35.7	30.3	0	2	**1**
2013	SEA	**3**	9	356	347	46	39.6	38.6	0	2	0
2014	SEA	**3**	**15**	**635**	**568**	**61**	42.3	37.9	0	**6**	0
2015	SEA	2	8	286	279	42	35.8	34.9	0	4	0
2016	SEA	2	5	232	222	60	**46.4**	**44.4**	0	2	0
Career		16	65	2,491	2,281	61	38.3	35.1	0	23	2

== Personal life ==
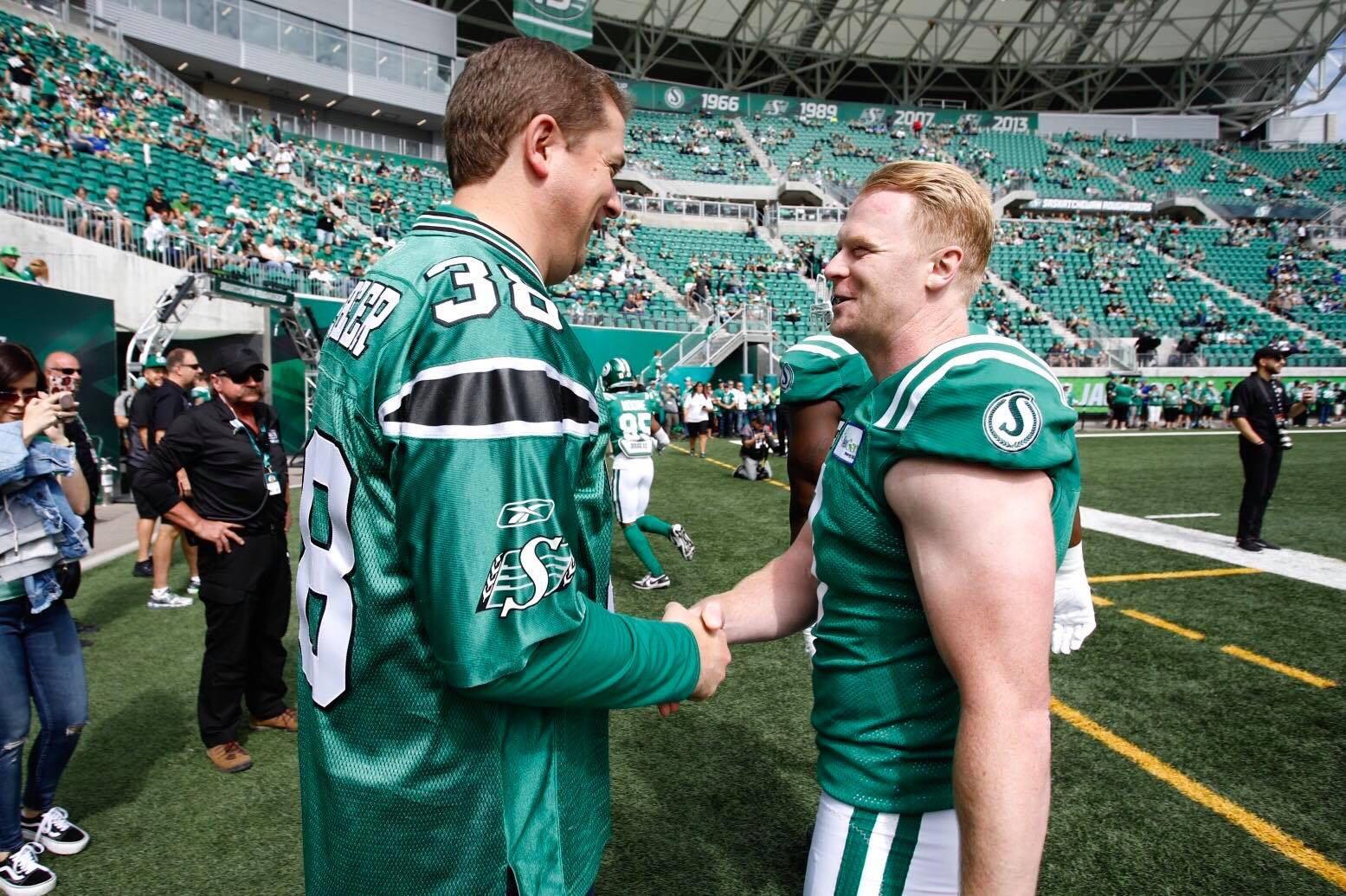
Ryan (while playing for the Roughriders in the 2019 Labour Day Classic) shakes hands with Canada's federal Opposition House Leader Andrew Scheer, his brother-in-law

Ryan is married to stand-up comedian Sarah Colonna and has appeared on her podcast Off The Rails, with Josh Wolf, numerous times. In 2015, he tried out for American Ninja Warrior, cheered on by Seahawk teammates Derrick Coleman and Jermaine Kearse. His older sister Jill is married to the Opposition House Leader, Andrew Scheer. He and Colonna both appeared on Bar Rescue as one of the recon spies for Black Light District Rock & Roll Lounge. Ryan is a supporter of Welsh professional football club Swansea City. On March 23, 2020, Ryan was diagnosed with skin cancer. However, he was confident that it was treatable, despite the ongoing COVID-19 pandemic.

Ryan became a co-owner of the West Coast League's Portland Pickles in 2017 and of the American Association of Professional Baseball's Cleburne Railroaders in 2021.
