= Maven Maurer =

Canadian football player (born 1975)

No. 19
- Position: Fullback

Personal information
- Born: November 6, 1975 (age 51); Saskatoon, Saskatchewan, Canada
- Listed height: 6 ft 0 in (1.83 m)
- Listed weight: 230 lb (104 kg)

Career information
- High school: F.W. Johnson Collegiate
- CJFL: Regina Rams
- CFL draft: 1997

Career history
- 1997–2000: Saskatchewan Roughriders
- 2000–2001: BC Lions
- 2002–2004: Ottawa Renegades
- 2005–2009: Edmonton Eskimos

Awards and highlights
- 2× Grey Cup champion (2000, 2005); 2005 Dick Suderman Trophy; Eskimos' Most Outstanding Special Teams Player (2006)
- Stats at CFL.ca

Maven Maurer (born November 6, 1975; né: Michael Maurer) is a Canadian former professional football player who was a fullback and special teams player for 13 seasons in the Canadian Football League (CFL). She played with the Saskatchewan Roughriders, BC Lions, Ottawa Renegades, and Edmonton Eskimos. Maurer made her first public reference to her gender transition on social media in June 2023.

== Playing career ==
Maurer played junior football with the Regina Rams from 1994 to 1996 and was signed as a territorial exemption by the Saskatchewan Roughriders in 1997, appearing in 39 games over four seasons with the Roughriders before being released in August 2000.

Maurer signed with the BC Lions and won the 88th Grey Cup in 2000, and appeared in 17 games in 2001. He was selected by the Ottawa Renegades in the 2002 expansion draft and appeared in 44 games with the Renegades over the next three seasons.

After the Renegades folded, Maurer signed with the Edmonton Eskimos on May 15, 2005, and made his impact primarily on special teams.

In the 93rd Grey Cup against the Montreal Alouettes, which the Eskimos won by a score of 38-35 in overtime, she caught 4 passes for 41 yards substituting for fullback Mathieu Bertrand and won the Dick Suderman Trophy as the Most Valuable Canadian in the Grey Cup.

Maurer retired from football in May 2008. Although Maurer started a logging business, he came out of retirement late in the 2009 season to rejoin Edmonton, playing in three regular season games.

Following retirement again in 2009, Maurer's 13 years in the CFL resulted in playing 152 games, during which she rushed for 115 yards and a touchdown on 34 carries, caught 64 passes for 643 yards and three more scores, and made a combined 172 tackles (4 defensive and 168 on special teams).

She was named (as Maven) to the Edmonton 2000s All-Decade Team as a special teamer in 2024.

== Post-playing career ==
Maurer debuted in Maximum Fighting Championship during the CFL off-season in 2006. Using the nickname Wolverine, her fighting style is Brazilian Jiu-Jitsu.

== Personal life and gender transition ==
Maurer served in the Canadian Forces from 1993 to 1994, before returning to playing football.

Maurer was married and has three daughters. The marriage ended shortly after she came out as transgender and moved from Regina, Saskatchewan to Jasper, Alberta.
