= Laura Landauer =

Canadian actress, singer and comedian

- Born: Montreal, Quebec, Canada
- Education: Dawson College
- Occupations: actress, singer and comedian

Laura Landauer is a Canadian actress, singer and comedian best known for her impersonation of Céline Dion.

She appeared as a guest judge on Video on Trial and as a finalist on Bathroom Divas. She also appeared in The Love Guru, and played the part of Shapeshifter on Odd Squad.

She was born in Montreal, Quebec and studied theatre at Dawson College (The Dome Theatre).
