= Campbell Collegiate =

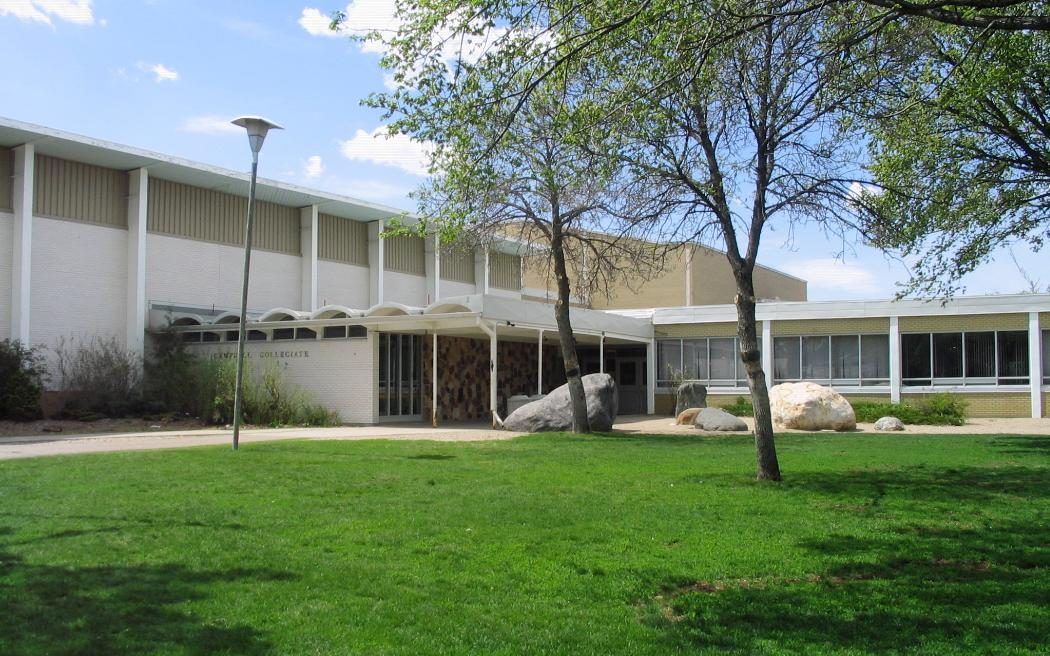

Location
- 102 Massey Road; Regina, Saskatchewan, S4S 4M9; Canada; 50.41266°N 104.61050°W

Information
- School type: High School
- Motto: "Ne Obliviscaris" (Let Us Not Forget)
- Founded: 1963
- School board: Regina Public School Division
- Principal: Dale Girodat
- Grades: 9-12
- Enrollment: 1,489 (2022)
- Language: English, French Immersion
- Area: Regina
- Colours: Green and Gold
- Mascot: McTavish
- Team name: Tartans
- Website: campbellcollegiate.rbe.sk.ca

Campbell Collegiate is a public high school located in the Whitmore Park area of south Regina, Saskatchewan, Canada. A part of Regina Public Schools, it has been operated since 1963 and currently has the largest student population among high schools in Regina.

== Associate schools ==
Campbell's associate schools include, Dr. A.E. Perry, Grant Road, Harbour Landing, Jack MacKenzie, Marion McVeety, W.S. Hawrylak, Wascana Plains, Wilfred Hunt and Wilfrid Walker.

== Student Leadership Council (SLC) ==
The Student Leadership Council (formerly the Student Representative Council) at Campbell Collegiate is responsible for student activities, including "Welcome Week" for Grade 9 students and pep rallies. The SLC Constitution is the rulebook which elaborates on the SLC's duties and responsibilities. It was ratified by the SLC and the student body in spring 2010.

In previous years, the student council was known as the Student Activities Council (SAC).

== Athletics ==
Campbell Collegiate hosts various athletic tournaments for high schools both from within and out of the province. It also includes tournaments such as the Campbell Invitational Tournament (CIT) and the Campbell Invitational Volleyball Tournament (CIVT).

Campbell Collegiate won the SHSAA Provincial Championship in football for the 1973, 1975, 1976, 1996, 2010 and 2017 seasons. They've also won the 5A boys provincial basketball championship in 1975, 1976, 1982, 1997, 2005, 2009, and 2017, and boys volleyball in 2008 and 2012.

The Campbell senior girls volleyball team was the SHSAA 5A Provincial Champion in 2013, 2015, 2018 and 2019 and the senior girls basketball team was 5A champions in 1978 and 2014.

The Campbell boys Soccer team were the SHSAA Provincial Champion in 2009 and 2016. The boys also became City Champions in 1983, 1988, 1990, 1996, 1997, 2006, 2007, 2010, 2016, and 2022, with the girls also being City Champions in 1992, 1994, 1998, 2002, 2005, 2008, 2014, 2015, and 2018.

== Music ==
The school offers core music classes in each grade, as well as choral and band as credit courses. The Grade 9 Concert Band & Concert Choir introduces new students to playing in an ensemble environment. The school features open groups for older students as well.

== Sports ==
- Badminton
- Basketball (Senior & Junior, Boys & Girls)
- Cheerleading
- Cross Country
- Curling
- Football
- Hockey
- Soccer (Boys & Girls)
- Track & Field
- Volleyball (Senior & Junior, Boys & Girls)
- Wrestling
- Handball

== Notable alumni ==
- Wade Regehr, Harvard neurobiologist
- Jan Betker, Olympic curler
- Eric Grimson, 1980 PhD from and Chancellor of Massachusetts Institute of Technology
- Mike Blaisdell, NHL Hockey Player
- N. Murray Edwards, lawyer and businessman
- Kelly Jefferson, musician
- Connie Kaldor, musician
- Sarah Lind, actress
- Joel Lipinski, CFL football player
- Lucas Makowsky, Olympic gold medalist speed skater
- Amy Nixon, Olympic curler
- Darren Veitch, NHL Hockey Player
- Tesher, musician

== Affiliated communities ==
- Albert Park (pop. 11,450)
- Arcola East - North (pop. 9995)
- Arcola East - South (pop. 7665)
- Boothill (pop. 2765)
- Cathedral (pop. 7085)
- Core Area (pop. 4430)
- Gladmer Park (pop. 1470)
- Glencairn (pop. 12,820)
- Glenelm (pop. 3235)
- Hillsdale (pop. 5795)
- Lakeview (pop. 7600)
- Whitmore Park (pop. 6425)
- Windsor Park
- Harbour Landing (pop. 14,000)
