= Martin Collegiate =

High school in Regina, Saskatchewan, Canada

Location
- 1100 McIntosh Street; Regina, Saskatchewan, S4T 5B7; Canada; 50.46151°N 104.65336°W

Information
- School type: High School
- Motto: "Hinc Fortior et Clarior" (Henceforth Stronger and Brighter)
- Founded: 1959
- School board: Regina Public School Division
- Principal: Mark Wilson
- Grades: 9-12
- Enrollment: 757 (2022)
- Language: English
- Area: Regina
- Colours: Green and White
- Team name: Monarchs
- Website: martincollegiate.rbe.sk.ca

Martin Collegiate, also known as Martin Collegiate Institute or MCI, is a high school located in the Rosemont/Mount Royal neighbourhood in the north end of Regina, Saskatchewan, Canada. A part of Regina Public Schools, it is a designated community school, and currently has a student body population of approximately 757.

Martin's current feeder elementary schools are McLurg School, Rosemont Community School, Ruth M. Buck School, and Walker School.

== Namesake ==
Martin Collegiate is named for William Melville Martin, a lawyer and politician who served from 1916 until 1922 as Saskatchewan's second premier. He also served as Member of Parliament for Regina. William Martin was also a judge of the Saskatchewan Court of Appeal for thirty-nine years (1922-1961), including twenty years as Chief Justice of Saskatchewan (1941-1961).

== Affiliated communities ==
- Dieppe (pop. 1815)
- McNab (pop. 1505)
- Normanview (pop. 4280)
- Normanview West (pop. 3240)
- North Central (pop. 10,350)
- Prairie View (pop. 6325)
- Regent Park (pop. 2755)
- Rosemont/Mount Royal (pop. 8485)

== Notable alumni ==
- Garth Murray, Former NHL player
