= Barry Pittendrigh =

Canadian-American molecular biologist

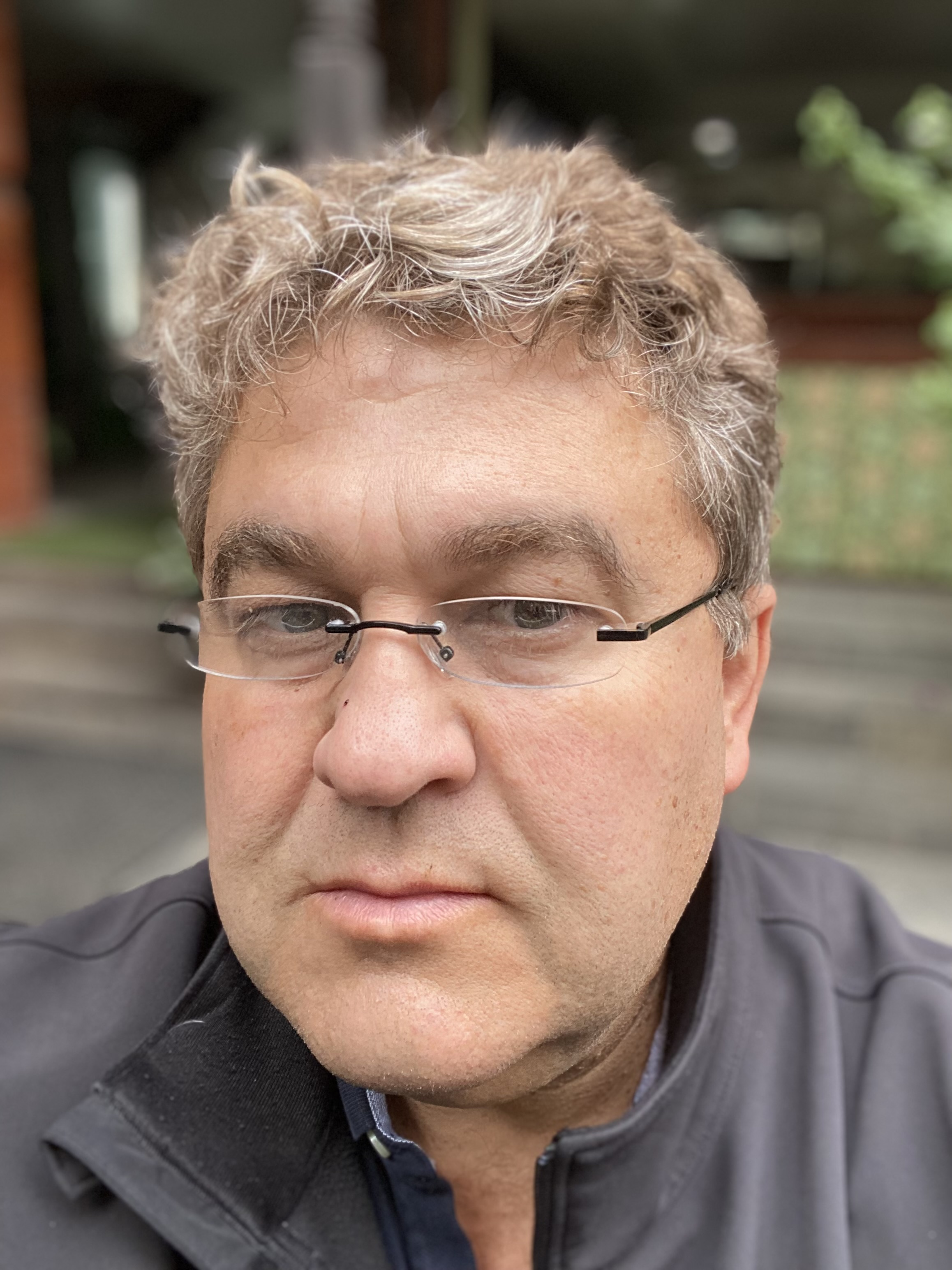
- Born: Regina, Saskatchewan
- Title: John V. Osmun Endowed Chair

Academic background
- Education: B.Sc. Honours, Biology (1990); M.S., Entomology (1994); Ph.D., Entomology (1999)
- Alma mater: University of Regina; Purdue University; University of Wisconsin at Madison

Academic work
- Institutions: Purdue University

Barry Robert Pittendrigh is a Canadian-American molecular biologist, researcher and educator. He holds the John V. Osmun Endowed Chair and is the director of the Center for Urban and Industrial Pest Management at Purdue University.

== Early life and education ==
Pittendrigh was born and raised in Regina, Saskatchewan, where he went to Thom Collegiate. He received his B.Sc. Honours in Biology from University of Regina in 1990. Later he moved to the United States, where he received his M.S. in Entomology from Purdue University in 1994 and a Ph.D. in Entomology from University of Wisconsin-Madison in 1999. He completed his post-doctoral training at the Max Planck Institute for Chemical Ecology in Jena, Germany, in 2000.

== Career ==
In 2000, Pittendrigh joined Purdue University as an assistant professor in the Department Entomology, becoming associate professor in 2004. In 2008, he left Purdue University and joined University of Illinois at Urbana-Champaign, where he was both a professor and held the C.W. Kearns, C.L. Metcalf and W.P. Flint Endowed Chair in Insect Toxicology. Pittendrigh left the University of Illinois at Urbana-Champaign in 2016 to join Michigan State University, where he held an MSU Foundation Professor position.

In January 2021, he returned to Purdue University where he holds John V. Osmun Endowed Chair and is the Director of the Center for Urban and Industrial Pest Management.

== Research and work ==
Pittendrigh has used Drosophila melanogaster as a model system to understand how organisms respond to dietary factors or drugs, or evolve resistance to xenobiotics such as pesticides. Most notably his research has used genomic, transcriptomic, and proteomic approaches to understand the evolution of resistance to pesticides. He was the lead author on the White Paper that was funded by NIH for the sequencing of the body louse genome.

In 2008, an insect species, Myrsidea pittendrighi was named in "honor of Barry Pittendrigh in recognition of his efforts to organize and obtain the first complete sequences of a louse genome, which will be a great asset to work on the systematics of lice."

In 2011, Pittendrigh and collaborator Julia Bello-Bravo, launched Scientific Animations Without Borders (SAWBO), a program focused on taking expert knowledge and placing it into a video animation format, where the content can be placed into numerous languages.

== Awards and honors ==
- 2013 – Campus Award for Excellence in Public Engagement for the Scientific Animations Without Borders program
- 2015 – Innovation Celebration: Social Venture Award for Scientific Animations Without Borders
- 2016 – John V. Osmun Award Alumni Professional Achievement Award, Purdue University

== Selected publications ==
- Pedra, J.H.F.; McIntyre, L.M.; Scharf, M.E.; Pittendrigh, B.R. (2004). "Genome-wide transcription profile of field- and laboratory-selected DDT-resistant Drosophila". Proceedings of the National Academy of Sciences. 101 (18): 7034–7039. doi:10.1073/pnas.0308458101 (inactive 1 July 2025).
- Pedra, J.H.F.; Festucci-Buselli, R.A.; Sun, W.; Muir, W.M.; Scharf, M.E.; Pittendrigh, B.R. (2005). "Profiling of abundant proteins associated with dichlorodiphenyltrichloroethane (DDT)-resistance in Drosophila melanogaster". Proteomics. 5 (1): 258–269. doi:10.1002/pmic.200400915. PMID 15378755.
- Kirkness, Ewen F.; Haas, Brian J.; Sun, Weilin; Pittendrigh, B.R. (2010). "Genome sequences of the human body louse and its primary endosymbiont provide insights into the permanent parasitic lifestyle". Proceedings of the National Academy of Sciences. 107 (27): 12168–12173. Bibcode:2010PNAS..10712168K. doi:10.1073/pnas.1003379107. PMC 2901460. PMID 20566863.
- McDonnell, C.M.; King, D.; Comeron, J.M.; Li, H.; Sun, W.; Berenbaum, M.R.; Schuler, M.A.; Pittendrigh, B.R. (2012). "Evolutionary toxicogenomics: diversification of the Cyp12d1 and Cyp12d3 genes in Drosophila species". Journal of Molecular Evolution. 74 (5–6): 281–296. doi:10.1007/s00239-012-9512-5. PMID 22782647.
- Seong, K.M.; Sun, W.; Clark, J.M.; Pittendrigh, B.R. (2016). "Splice form variant and amino acid changes in MDR49 confers DDT resistance in transgenic Drosophila". Scientific Reports. 6 23355. Bibcode:2016NatSR...623355S. doi:10.1038/srep23355. PMC 4802207. PMID 27003579.
- Seong, K.M.; Coates, B.; Kim, D.; Hansen, A.; Pittendrigh, B. (2018). "Differentially expressed microRNAs associated with changes of transcript levels in detoxification pathways and DDT-resistance in the Drosophila melanogaster strain 91-R". PLOS ONE. 13 (4) e0196518. Bibcode:2018PLoSO..1396518S. doi:10.1371/journal.pone.0196518. PMC 5919617. PMID 29698530.
