= Mary Lou Fallis =

Canadian opera singer (born 1948)

- Born: April 22, 1948 (age 78); Toronto, Ontario, Canada
- Other name: Primadonna
- Education: University of Toronto
- Occupation: Opera singer
- Awards: Order of Canada (2011)

Mary Lou Fallis CM (born April 22, 1948) is a Canadian opera singer. She performs both serious opera roles and comedic shows as the character Primadonna, a satirical take on popular stereotypes of opera divas. She wrote an autobiographical show called Primadonna which was first performed in 1982 at the Stratford Festival and then toured Canada and internationally.

Born in Toronto, Ontario, Fallis began her education as a singer with her grandmother, Jennie Bouck. She made her debut at age 15 in a CBC Television production of The Magic Flute. She is a graduate of the University of Toronto and won the CBC Talent Competition in 1973. She teaches at the University of Western Ontario, having previously taught at Queen's University at Kingston, the University of Western Ontario, and York University. She was a judge on the reality series Bathroom Divas: So You Want To Be An Opera Star? in 2006, and won a Gemini Award as a music producer for it.

In 2011, she was made a Member of the Order of Canada "for her contributions, as a performer and broadcaster, in making classical music more accessible to Canadians across the country." She has also won an ACTRA Award. In 2014, she was awarded an honorary Doctor of Music from Carleton University.
