= Cochrane High School (Regina, Saskatchewan) =

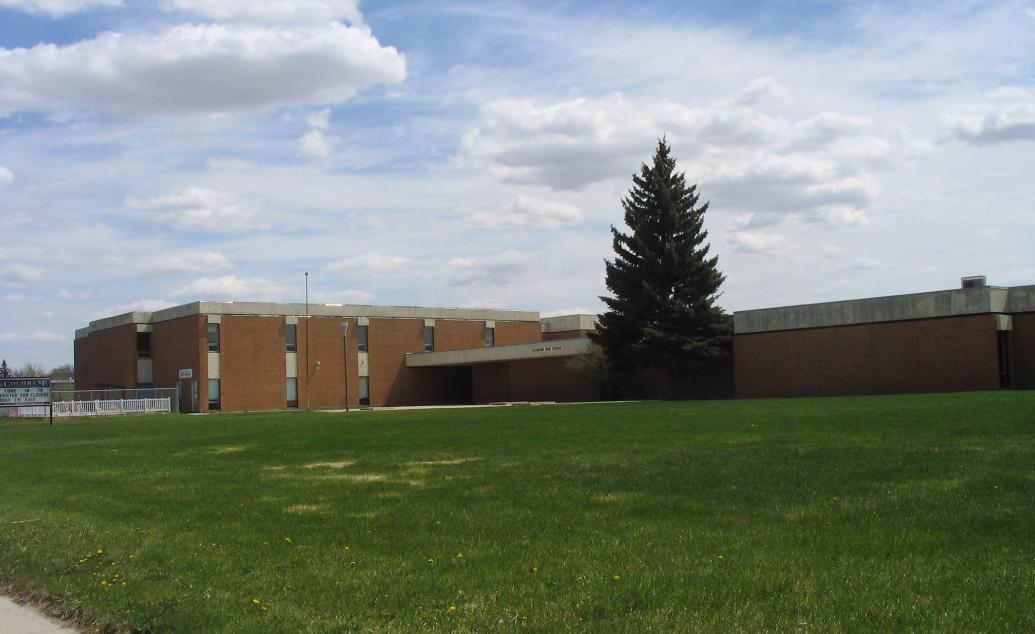

Location
- 1069 14th Avenue East; Regina, Saskatchewan, S4N 0T8; Canada; 50.44328°N 104.56841°W

Information
- School type: High School
- Founded: 1972
- Closed: 2015
- School board: Regina Public School Division
- Principal: Mr. McKillop
- Grades: 9-12
- Enrollment: 500
- Language: English
- Area: Regina
- Colours: Blue and White
- Team name: Crusaders
- Website: cochranehighschool.rbe.sk.ca

Cochrane High School was an alternative secondary school in Regina, Saskatchewan, Canada. The building is located in the Crescent Park neighborhood in the East-central area of the city. The focus of Cochrane's specialized education curriculum was to prepare students to enter the employment field upon graduation. It was a part of Regina Public Schools.

Fifty percent of Cochrane's student body are of self-declared Aboriginal ancestry.

Maclean's magazine named Cochrane as one of Canada's ten best high schools in 2004.

The Cochrane High School is no longer running as its former self. It was repurposed into a program called Campus Regina Public and is available to all grade 11 and 12 students registered with Regina Public Schools.
