= Scott Collegiate =

Location
- 3355 6th Avenue; Regina, Saskatchewan, S4T 3H7; Canada; 50.45873°N 104.62936°W

Information
- School type: High school
- Founded: 1924
- School board: Regina Public School Division
- Principal: Seth Neuls
- Grades: 9-12
- Enrollment: 322 (2022)
- Language: English
- Area: Regina
- Colours: Blue and white
- Team name: Wolves
- Website: scottcollegiate.rbe.sk.ca

Scott Collegiate is a public high school located in the North Central neighbourhood of Regina, Saskatchewan, Canada. Operated by Regina Public Schools, it is named for Walter Scott, the first premier of Saskatchewan. It is an officially designated community school.

Opened in 1924, Scott Collegiate was the second high school to be built in Regina, after Regina Collegiate Institute (later renamed Central Collegiate Institute after the opening of Scott). Scott had the title of being the oldest surviving high school building in the city. In 2017, Scott Collegiate moved into the Mâmawêyatitân Centre (Mâmawêyatitân is a Cree word meaning "lets all be together"), which has since replaced the original building, that was torn down on August 2, 2017.

With the move to mâmawêyatitân centre in 2017, Scott Collegiate's team name was changed from its original "Blues" to the Wolves.

Academically, the school year at Scott is divided into four quarters.

Scott's three main feeder elementary schools are Albert Community School, Kitchener Community School and Seven Stones Community School.

== Pathways ==
Many of the classes at Scott Collegiate are connected with Pathways, such as Tourism and Hospitality and Communications Media. These pathways often lead to community events, such as "Taste of Scott", which is put on by the Cooking project and involves student-run restaurant booths, with guests voting on their favorite dishes. Scott Collegiate also has offered a Mental Health and Addictions class, giving students the tools to speak out about mental health and addictions.

In 2014, the Grade 10 Construction project, which combined grade 10 English, Math and Construction credits, led to the construction of an "Angel's Corner" - benches to honor those who are victims of violence. A plaque on one of the benches reads, "Angels Corner shines a light on the violence and abuse faced by women in our society. It stands as a reminder of women who have lost their lives to violence, including missing and murdered Aboriginal women, and of the help available to women living with violence and abuse."

In 2018, to encourage community discussion about reconciliation, Scott Collegiate held a special event and screening of the movie Indian Horse. The event, put on by a Grade 11 class, included former NHL player Fred Sasakamoose speaking of his experiences at St. Michael's Indian Residential School at Duck Lake and his hockey career.

== Renovations ==
In March 2009, it was announced that the current Scott Collegiate building would be demolished and replaced with mâmawêyatitân centre (previously referred to as North Central Integrated Facility). Scott re-opened, as part of a schooling system within the facility, in 2017. mâmawêyatitân centre also houses a Regina Public Library branch, a child care facility, a city recreational complex and a community police station.

== Affiliated communities ==
- North Central Regina (pop. 10,350)
- Eastview (pop. 1930)
- Coronation Park (pop. 7235)

== Notable alumni ==
- Dirk Graham, former National Hockey League player and head coach
