= F.W. Johnson Collegiate =

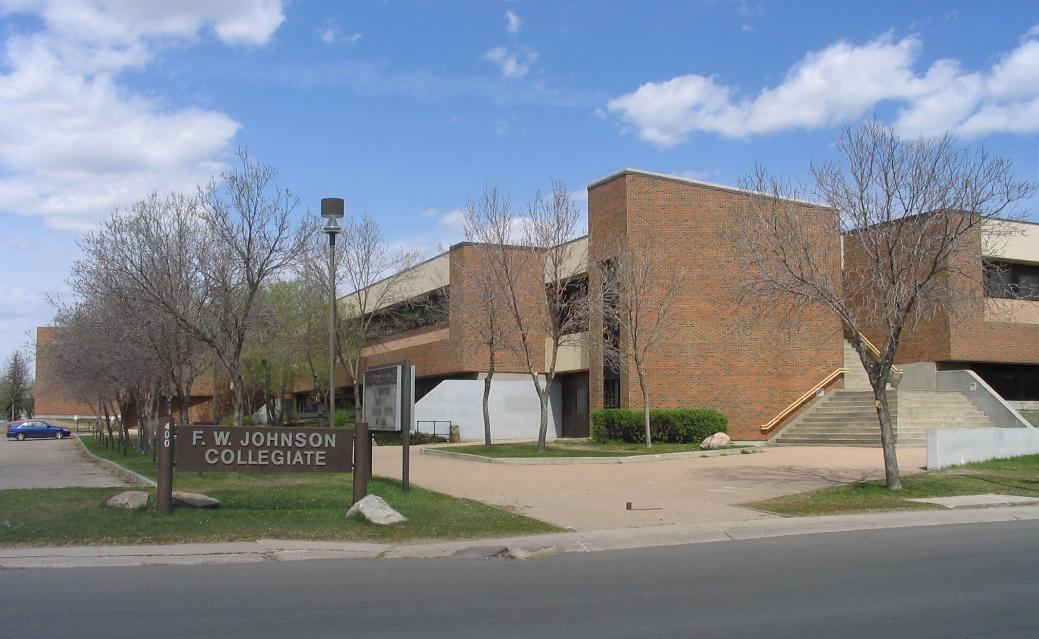

Location
- 400 Fines Drive; Regina, Saskatchewan, S4N 5L9; Canada; 50.4498°N 104.5477°W

Information
- School type: High school
- Motto: Fortitude, Wisdom, Justice
- Founded: 1985
- School board: Regina Public School Division
- Principal: Seth Neuls
- Grades: 9-12
- Enrollment: 658 (2024-25)
- Language: English
- Area: Regina
- Colours: Maroon and grey
- Mascot: Willy Wildcat
- Team name: Wildcats
- Website: fwjohnsoncollegiate.rbe.sk.ca

F.W. Johnson Collegiate is a high school situated in the Glencairn neighbourhood of east Regina, Saskatchewan, Canada. A part of Regina Public Schools, the school was named after Frederick W. Johnson, the 16th lieutenant governor of Saskatchewan. The school's academic program operates based on a differentiated instruction model.

Students hail primarily from the Glencairn area of the city. It currently has four main feeder schools: Dr. George Ferguson School, Glen Elm School, Henry Braun School Judge Bryant School, and Wascana Plains School.

== Athletics ==
F.W Johnson Collegiate is a member of the RHSAA, which includes notable sports such as Football, Soccer, Badminton, Cross Country, Wrestling, Hockey, Volleyball and more.

== Notable alumni ==
- Jamie Heward, former NHL defenceman
- Maven Maurer, former CFL fullback
- Shiloh, singer
