= Thom Collegiate =

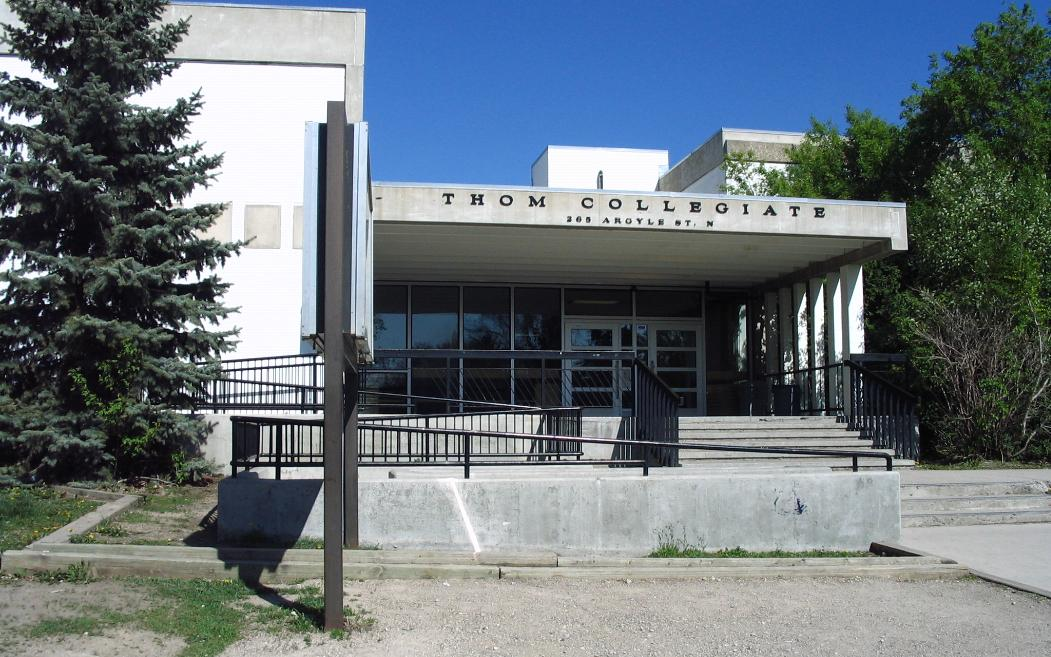
- Thom Collegiate

Location
- 265 Argyle Street North; Regina, Saskatchewan, S4R 4C7; Canada; 50.48066°N 104.63157°W

Information
- School type: High School
- Motto: "Veritas Vincit" (Truth Conquers)
- Founded: 1963
- School board: Regina Public School Division
- Principal: Ms. J. Sutherland
- Grades: 9-12
- Enrollment: 727 (2022)
- Language: English, French Immersion
- Area: Regina
- Colours: White and Black
- Mascot: Tommy Trojan
- Team name: Trojans
- Website: thomcollegiate.rbe.sk.ca

Thom Collegiate is a public high school located in the Coronation Park area of north Regina, SK. A part of Regina Public Schools, it is named after Douglas J. Thom - a lawyer, author, and member of the Regina Collegiate Board.

The school offers a dual-track French immersion program. It also provides various Advanced Placement courses.

Thom's feeder schools include Coronation Park Community School, Dr. L.M. Hanna School, École Centennial Community School, École Elsie Mironuck Community School, Gladys McDonald School, M.J. Coldwell School, Ruth Pawson School, and tawâw School.

Thom Collegiate’s programs include a student advisory program known as “T’nT” or “Trojan Time,” which promotes student belonging, monitors attendance and academic progress, and supports post-secondary and career planning. Thom Collegiate In addition to its dual-track French immersion program and Advanced Placement offerings, the school provides support through its Learning Resource program, English as an Additional Language (EAL) support, a Supportive Environment Program (SEP), and vocational programs.

Thom has a rich extracurricular life, offering a wide variety of clubs and activities including robotics, beading, outdoor pursuits, math club, a Thom Muslim Student Association, a GSA, art club, and more.

The campus also features the John Davies Resource Centre (library), and a dedicated space called Trojan Territory where students can purchase school spirit gear.

== Athletics ==
Sports offered at Thom include:

- Cheerleading
- Badminton
- Basketball
- Cross Country
- Curling
- Football
- Hockey
- Rugby
- Soccer
- Track and Field
- Volleyball
- Wrestling
- Judo

== Notable alumni ==
- Drew Callander, Former NHL player
- Jock Callander, Former NHL player
- Stu Foord, Former CFL player
- Neal Hughes, Former CFL player
- Nick Hutchins, Former CFL player
- Kennedy Nkeyasen, CFL player
- Barry Pittendrigh, Molecular biologist
- Kevin Tkachuk, Rugby player
- Dan Clark (Canadian football), CFL player

== Affiliated communities ==
- Argyle Park-Englewood (pop. 3990)
- Coronation Park (pop. 6555)
- Dieppe (pop. 1815)
- Normanview (pop. 4280)
- Normanview West (pop. 3240)
- North Central (pop. 10,350)
- Northeast (pop. 7090)
- Prairie View (pop. 6325)
- Regent Park (pop. 2755)
- Rosemont/Mount Royal (pop. 8485)
- Sherwood/McCarthy (pop. 6695)
- Twin Lakes (pop. 5510)
- Uplands (pop. 5610)
- Walsh Acres/Lakeridge (pop. 7100)
