= Balfour Collegiate =

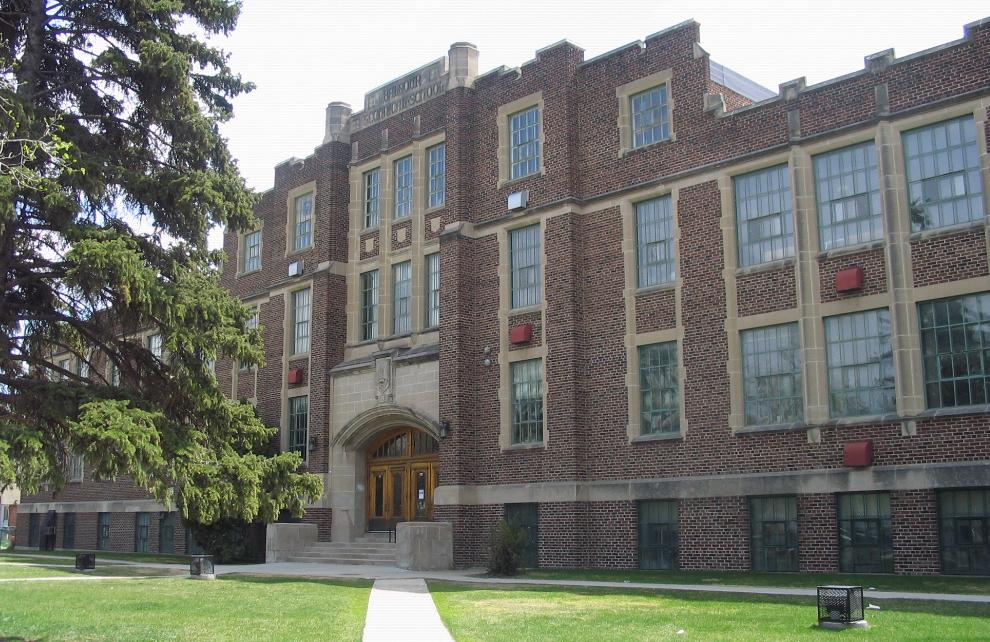

Location
- 1245 College Avenue; Regina, Saskatchewan, S4P 1B1; Canada; 50.4402°N 104.5991°W

Information
- School type: High School
- Motto: Tradition and Togetherness
- Founded: 1930
- School board: Regina Public School Division
- Principal: Dean Miezianko
- Grades: 9-12
- Enrollment: 766 (2022)
- Language: English
- Area: Regina
- Colours: Red, White and Black
- Team name: Bears
- Website: balfour.rbe.sk.ca

Balfour Collegiate is a public high school in Regina, Saskatchewan, Canada, named after the city's former mayor, James Balfour. A part of Regina Public Schools, it officially opened on September 2, 1930. It is located in the Core Group neighbourhood of central Regina. Originally a technical school (with an attached commercial high school), Balfour was given official collegiate status in 1984 due to the closure of nearby Central Collegiate Institute.

Balfour Collegiate was chosen in 1995 as an exemplary secondary school by the Canadian Education Association.

Its feeder schools include Arcola Community School, Douglas Park School, Thomson Community School, Wascana Plains School, W.F Ready school.

== Activities ==
- Balfour Arts Collective
- Athletic Trainers
- Canteen Staff
- Concert Band/Choir
- Dances
- Diversity Day
- Fall and Spring Productions
- Improv
- Jazz Ensemble
- Library Club
- Outdoor Club
- Peer Support
- Red Cross
- SADD
- Science Club
- Seniors' Night
- Student Rep. Council
- Vocal Jazz Ensemble
- Weightlifting Club
- Wellness Committee
- Yearbook

== Athletics ==
- Badminton
- Baseball
- Basketball
- Cross-country running
- Curling
- Cheer and Dance
- Football
- Golf
- Hockey
- Soccer
- Softball
- Track and Field
- Volleyball
- Wrestling

== Notable alumni ==
- Lloyd Ailsby, hockey player
- Stu Davis, country-western singer/songwriter
- Paul Dojack, CFL referee
- Dunc Fisher, hockey player

== Affiliated communities ==
- Al Ritchie (pop. 7860)
- Arcola East - North (pop. 9995)
- Arcola East - South (pop. 7665)
- Boothill (pop. 2765)
- Core Group (pop. 4430)
- Eastview (pop. 1555)
- Gladmer Park (pop. 1470)
