= Sheldon-Williams Collegiate =

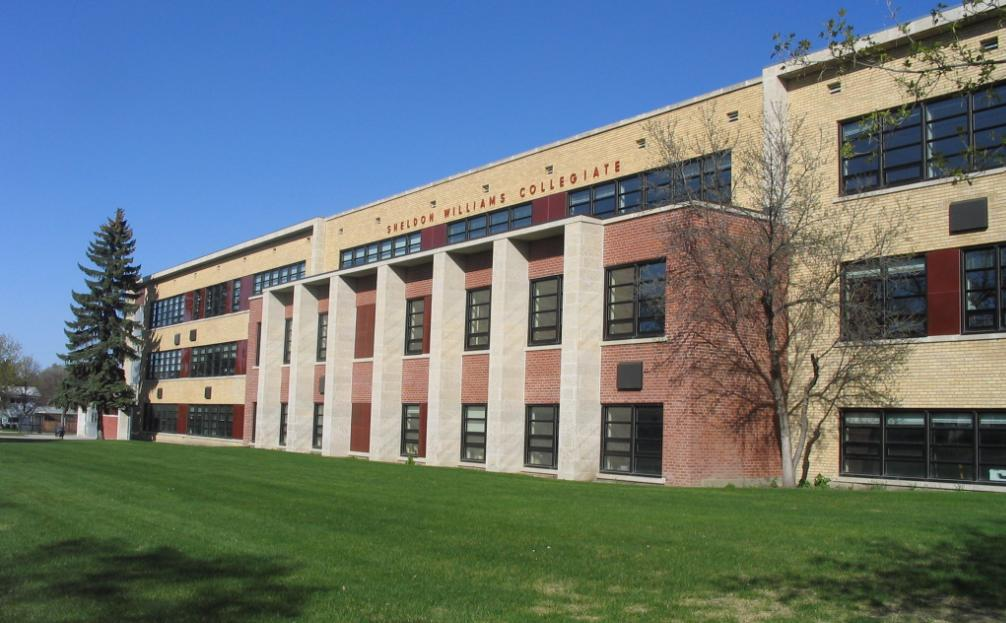

Location
- 2601 Coronation Street; Regina, Saskatchewan, S4S 0L4; Canada; 50.43685°N 104.63623°W

Information
- School type: High School
- Motto: Ad Vitam Paramus (Preparing For Life)
- Founded: 1956
- School board: Regina Public School Division
- Principal: Mick Panko
- Grades: 9-12/13
- Enrollment: 702 (2022)
- Language: English
- Area: Regina
- Colours: Red and Gold
- Mascot: Sparky
- Team name: Spartans
- Website: sheldon.rbe.sk.ca

Sheldon-Williams Collegiate (SWC) is a high school for grades 9 through 12, located in the Lakeview neighbourhood of Regina, Saskatchewan, Canada.

A part of Regina Public Schools, Sheldon offers a variety of programs and extracurricular activities, including the VISA program, which integrates foreign and Canadian students. It is also well known for its fine arts program.

Its namesake, Catherine Sheldon-Williams, was an English immigrant and long-time school board member.

The school currently serves approximately 850 students. Its associate elementary schools are Argyle School, Connaught Community School, The Crescents School, Harbour Landing School, and Lakeview School.

== Notable alumni or staff ==
- Tyler Bozak, NHL hockey player, 2019 Stanley Cup Champion
- Rob Britton, professional cyclist, Tour of Utah 1st overall 2017, Tour of the Gila 1st overall 2018
- Ben Heenan, former offensive lineman, Indianapolis Colts, Grey Cup Champion 2013 champion for the Saskatchewan Roughriders
- Colin James, musician
- Steve Kaldestad, musician
- Sarah Kramer, author of best-selling vegan cookbooks
- Marc Mueller, CFL coach, former Regina Rams quarterback
- Jason Plumb, musician
- Jon Ryan, CFL punter with the Saskatchewan Roughriders, also Super Bowl XLVIII champion for the Seattle Seahawks
- Addison Richards, former CFL receiver with the Winnipeg Blue Bombers

== Affiliated communities ==
- Albert Park (pop. 11,450)
- Cathedral (pop. 7085)
- Lakeview (pop. 7600)
