= I Want to Be Your Property =

Single by Blue Mercedes

from the album Rich and Famous
- Released: 1987
- Recorded: 1987
- Genre: R&B, dance, synthpop, hi-NRG
- Length: 3:18; 6:51 (Daktari Mix); 7:18 (Street Latin Wolff Mix); 4:31 (Get Busy Yo Mix)
- Label: MCA Records
- Songwriters: David Titlow, Duncan Millar
- Producers: Phil Harding and Ian Curnow for PWL

Blue Mercedes singles chronology
"I Want to Be Your Property" (1987)	"See Want Must Have" (1988)

I Want to Be Your Property is a 1987 dance hit by Blue Mercedes. The single was most successful on the dance charts, making it to number one for four weeks and was the most successful dance single of 1988. "I Want to Be Your Property" was a crossover hit on the pop singles chart, and broke into the top 30 on the UK singles chart.

== Music video ==
- In reference to a line in the song's lyrics, actress/dancer, Cyd Charisse, appears in the group's video.

== Charts ==
=== Weekly charts ===
Chart (1988)	Peak position
Italy Airplay (Music & Media)	13
UK Singles Chart	23
U.S. Billboard Hot 100	66
U.S. Billboard Hot Dance Club Play	1
