= Brascia =

Brascia is an Italian surname. Notable people with the surname include:

- Christina Brascia, American actress
- John Brascia (1932–2013), American actor and dancer
- Maggie Brascia, American professional pickleball player
- Mary Brascia, American professional pickleball player
