= Duncan Millar =

Duncan Millar may refer to:

- Duncan Millar (VC)
- Duncan Millar (musician)

== See also ==
- Duncan & Miller Glass Company
