= Perspecta =

1950s movie sound system

Perspecta sound channel layout (Left, Center, Right)

Perspecta was a directional motion picture sound system invented by Fine Sound Inc. laboratories. The company was founded by Mercury Records engineer C. Robert "Bob" Fine, husband of producer Wilma Cozart Fine, and his associate engineer was Bob Eberenz. As opposed to magnetic stereophonic soundtracks available at the time, Perspecta's benefits were that it did not require a new sound head for the projector and thus was a cheaper alternative.

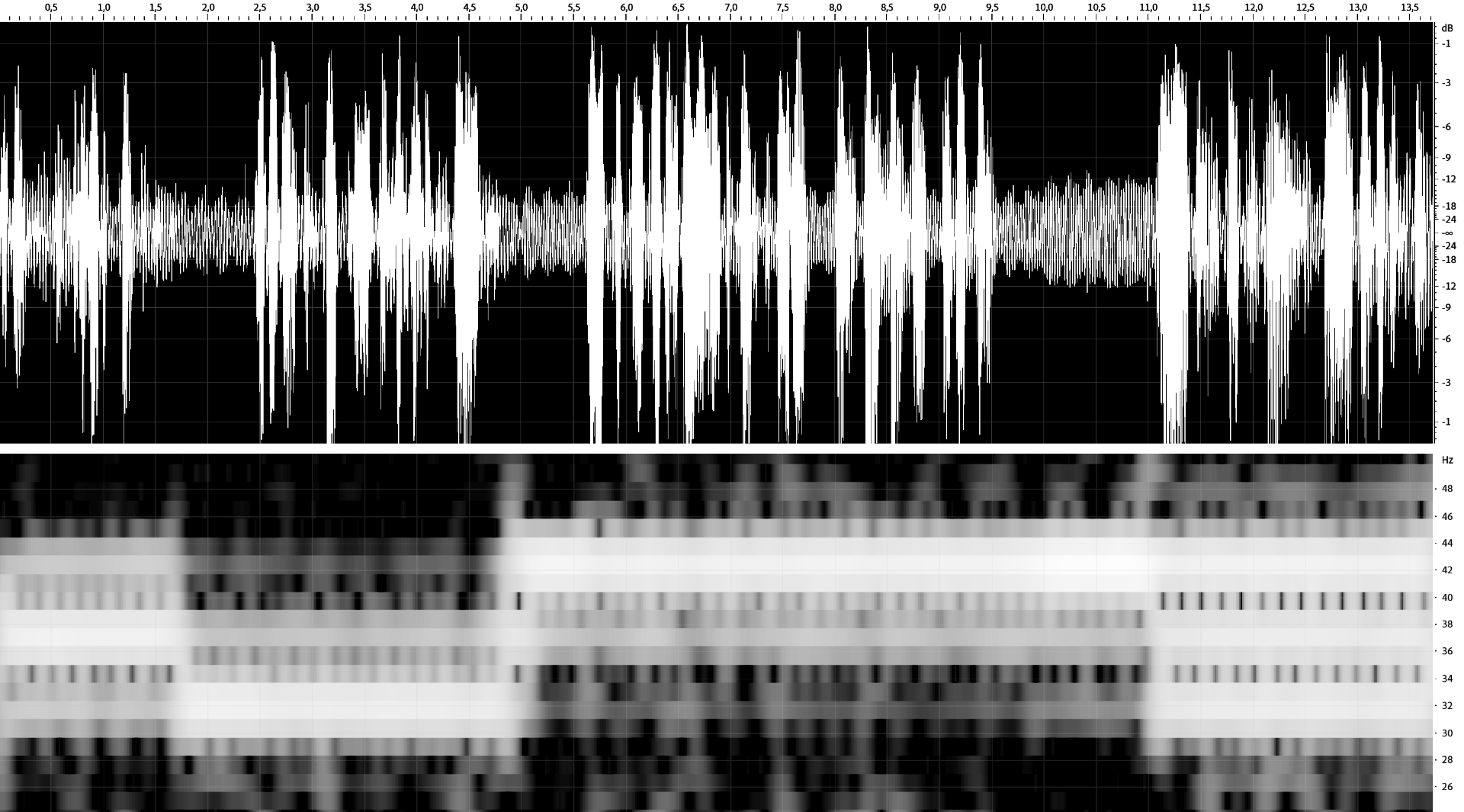
Perspecta sound signal, showing amplitude (top) and spectrogram of the control signals (bottom). In this example, control signals steer the sound to following speakers: C, L, R and LCR.

Introduced as a "directional sound system" rather than a true stereophonic sound system, Perspecta did not use discretely recorded sound signals. Instead, three sub-audible tones at 30 Hz, 35 Hz, and 40 Hz are mixed appropriately and embedded in a monaural optical soundtrack, in addition to the audible sound. When run through a Perspecta integrator, depending on whenever each tone is present, the audio is fed into a left (30 Hz), center (35 Hz) and right (40 Hz) speaker. Unlike true stereophonic sound, which would be described as discrete tracks running in synchronization in time and phase, Perspecta merely panned a mono mix across various channels. Because of this, only isolated dialogue or sound effects could be mixed to be directional. Mixed sound effects, dialogue and music could not be suitably mixed. Aside from panning, Perspecta controlled gain levels for each channel through the amplitude of each control signal.

Metro-Goldwyn-Mayer and Paramount Pictures were major supporters and developers of Perspecta. MGM used it on nearly everything that they released between mid-1954 to approximately 1958, including shorts, cartoons and trailers.

By late 1954, nearly 700 screens were equipped with Perspecta integrators, and by the end of next year this number quadrupled to nearly 2,800 screens.

Paramount used it, uncredited, on all their VistaVision pictures until it fell out of favor around 1958. In theory, the "High Fidelity" in VistaVision's trademark strongly implied high-fidelity sound, but, in reality, the system provided only higher-fidelity visual image, not higher-fidelity sound. Universal-International, Warner Bros. Pictures, Columbia Pictures, United Artists, and Toho were among some of the other major studios to utilize Perspecta regularly.

== List of Perspecta features ==
Studio	Film	Year	Notes
Allied Artists Pictures Corporation	Invasion of the Body Snatchers	1956	
Allied Artists Pictures Corporation	World Without End	1956	
Metro-Goldwyn-Mayer	Knights of the Round Table	1953	
Metro-Goldwyn-Mayer	Athena	1954	
Metro-Goldwyn-Mayer	Beau Brummell	1954	
Metro-Goldwyn-Mayer	Betrayed	1954	
Metro-Goldwyn-Mayer	Brigadoon	1954	
Metro-Goldwyn-Mayer	Deep in My Heart	1954	
Metro-Goldwyn-Mayer	Gone with the Wind	1954	reissue
Metro-Goldwyn-Mayer	Green Fire	1954	
Metro-Goldwyn-Mayer	Her Twelve Men	1954	
Metro-Goldwyn-Mayer	The Last Time I Saw Paris	1954	
Metro-Goldwyn-Mayer	Rogue Cop	1954	
Metro-Goldwyn-Mayer	Rose Marie	1954	
Metro-Goldwyn-Mayer	Seagulls Over Sorrento	1954	
Metro-Goldwyn-Mayer	Seven Brides for Seven Brothers	1954	
Metro-Goldwyn-Mayer	Valley of the Kings	1954	
Metro-Goldwyn-Mayer	Bad Day at Black Rock	1955	also magnetic
Metro-Goldwyn-Mayer	Bedevilled	1955	also magnetic
Metro-Goldwyn-Mayer	The Cobweb	1955	
Metro-Goldwyn-Mayer	The Glass Slipper	1955	
Metro-Goldwyn-Mayer	Hit the Deck	1955	
Metro-Goldwyn-Mayer	I'll Cry Tomorrow	1955	
Metro-Goldwyn-Mayer	It's Always Fair Weather	1955	
Metro-Goldwyn-Mayer	Jupiter's Darling	1955	
Metro-Goldwyn-Mayer	Kismet	1955	
Metro-Goldwyn-Mayer	The Last Hunt	1955	
Metro-Goldwyn-Mayer	Love Me or Leave Me	1955	
Metro-Goldwyn-Mayer	Moonfleet	1955	
Metro-Goldwyn-Mayer	The Tender Trap	1955	
Metro-Goldwyn-Mayer	The Fastest Gun Alive	1956	
Metro-Goldwyn-Mayer	Forbidden Planet	1956	also magnetic
Metro-Goldwyn-Mayer	High Society	1956	
Metro-Goldwyn-Mayer	Lust for Life	1956	
Metro-Goldwyn-Mayer	Meet Me in Las Vegas	1956	
Metro-Goldwyn-Mayer	Somebody Up There Likes Me	1956	
Metro-Goldwyn-Mayer	The Swan	1956	
Metro-Goldwyn-Mayer	Tea and Sympathy	1956	
Metro-Goldwyn-Mayer	The Teahouse of the August Moon	1956	
Metro-Goldwyn-Mayer	Tom and Jerry (animated shorts)	1956–58	
Metro-Goldwyn-Mayer	Designing Woman	1957	
Metro-Goldwyn-Mayer	House of Numbers	1957	
Metro-Goldwyn-Mayer	Jailhouse Rock	1957	
Metro-Goldwyn-Mayer	Les Girls	1957	
Metro-Goldwyn-Mayer	The Reluctant Debutante	1957	
Metro-Goldwyn-Mayer	The Seventh Sin	1957	
Metro-Goldwyn-Mayer	Silk Stockings	1957	
Metro-Goldwyn-Mayer	Tip on a Dead Jockey	1957	
Metro-Goldwyn-Mayer	Andy Hardy Comes Home	1958	
Metro-Goldwyn-Mayer	The Brothers Karamazov	1958	
Metro-Goldwyn-Mayer	Gigi	1958	also magnetic
Metro-Goldwyn-Mayer	The High Cost of Loving	1958	
Metro-Goldwyn-Mayer	High School Confidential!	1958	
Metro-Goldwyn-Mayer	I Accuse!	1958	
Metro-Goldwyn-Mayer	Imitation General	1958	
Metro-Goldwyn-Mayer	The Law and Jake Wade	1958	
Metro-Goldwyn-Mayer	Party Girl	1958	
Metro-Goldwyn-Mayer	The Sheepman	1958	
Metro-Goldwyn-Mayer	Torpedo Run	1958	
Metro-Goldwyn-Mayer	The Tunnel of Love	1958	
Paramount Pictures	White Christmas	1954	
Paramount Pictures	3 Ring Circus	1955	
Paramount Pictures	Artists and Models	1955	
Paramount Pictures	The Court Jester	1955	
Paramount Pictures	The Desperate Hours	1955	
Paramount Pictures	The Far Horizons	1955	
Paramount Pictures	The Girl Rush	1955	
Paramount Pictures	Hell's Island	1955	
Paramount Pictures	Lucy Gallant	1955	
Paramount Pictures	The Rose Tattoo	1955	
Paramount Pictures	Run for Cover	1955	
Paramount Pictures	The Seven Little Foys	1955	
Paramount Pictures	Strategic Air Command	1955	
Paramount Pictures	To Catch a Thief	1955	
Paramount Pictures	The Trouble with Harry	1955	
Paramount Pictures	We're No Angels	1955	
Paramount Pictures	You're Never Too Young	1955	
Paramount Pictures	Anything Goes	1956	
Paramount Pictures	The Birds and the Bees	1956	
Paramount Pictures	The Leather Saint	1956	
Paramount Pictures	The Man Who Knew Too Much	1956	
Paramount Pictures	Pardners	1956	
Paramount Pictures	The Proud and Profane	1956	
Paramount Pictures	The Scarlet Hour	1956	
Paramount Pictures	That Certain Feeling	1956	
Paramount Pictures	War and Peace	1956	Perspecta Stereophonic Sound ® By Suonitalia Studio - Rome
Paramount Pictures	Funny Face	1957	
Toho	The Mysterians	1957	
Toho	The Hidden Fortress	1958	
Toho	The H-Man	1958	
Toho	Varan the Unbelievable	1958	
Toho	Battle in Outer Space	1959	
Toho	The Secret of the Telegian	1960	
Toho	The Last War	1961	also magnetic
Toho	Mothra	1961	also magnetic
Toho	Yojimbo	1961	
Toho	Gorath	1962	also magnetic
Toho	King Kong vs. Godzilla	1962	also magnetic
Toho	Sanjuro	1962	
Toho	High and Low	1963	also magnetic
Toho	Red Beard	1965	also magnetic
United Artists	The Barefoot Contessa	1954	
Universal-International	The Black Shield of Falworth	1954	
Universal-International	One Desire	1955	
Universal-International	The Spoilers	1955	
Universal-International	This Island Earth	1955	
Universal-International	Away All Boats	1956	
Universal-International	The Benny Goodman Story	1956	
Warner Bros. Pictures	King Richard and the Crusaders	1954	also magnetic
Warner Bros. Pictures	Lucky Me	1954	also magnetic
Warner Bros. Pictures	A Star Is Born	1954	also magnetic
Warner Bros. Pictures	East of Eden	1955	also magnetic

== See also ==
- Duophonic, another form of "fake stereo"
