= Cyd Charisse =

American dancer and actress (1922–2008)

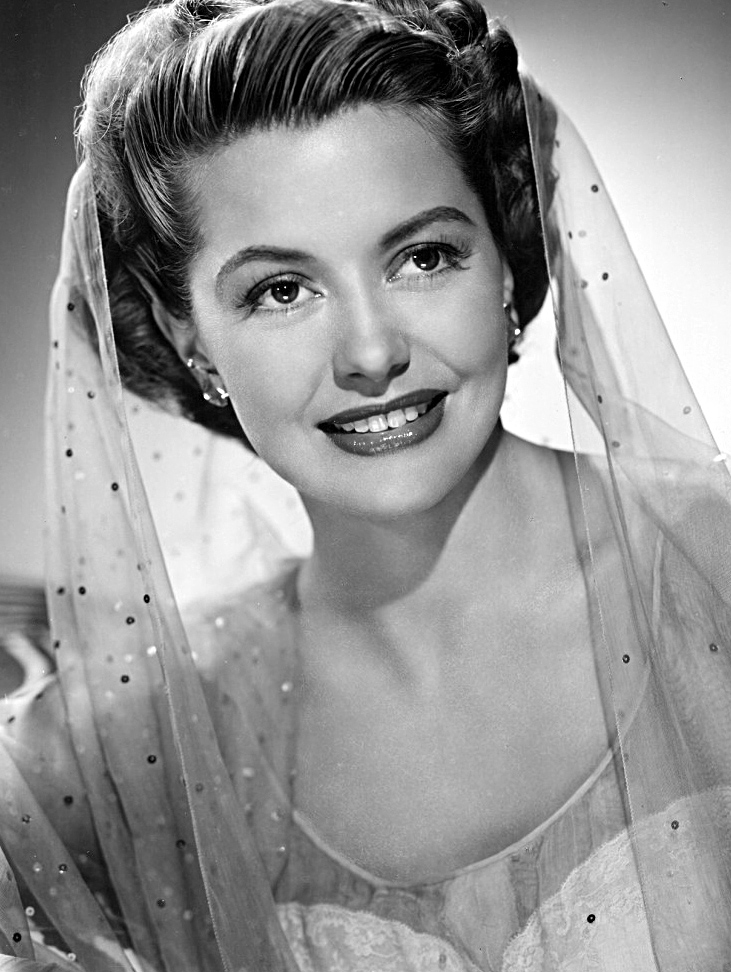
- Charisse in 1949
- Born: Tula Ellice Finklea; March 8, 1922; Amarillo, Texas, U.S.
- Died: June 17, 2008 (aged 86); Los Angeles, California, U.S.
- Resting place: Hillside Memorial Park Cemetery
- Other names: Lily Norwood; Felia Siderova; Maria Istomina
- Occupations: Actress; dancer
- Years active: 1939–2008
- Spouses: Nico Charisse (m. 1939; div. 1947) Tony Martin (m. 1948)
- Children: 2
- Relatives: Nana Visitor (niece)

Cyd Charisse (born Tula Ellice Finklea; March 8, 1922 – June 17, 2008) was an American dancer and actress.

After recovering from polio as a child and studying ballet, Charisse entered films in the 1940s. Her roles usually featured her abilities as a dancer, and she was often paired with Fred Astaire or Gene Kelly. Her films included Singin' in the Rain (1952), The Band Wagon (1953), Brigadoon (1954), and Silk Stockings (1957). She stopped dancing in films in the late 1950s but continued acting in film and television, and in 1991 she made her Broadway debut. In her later years she discussed the history of the Hollywood musical in documentaries and was featured in That's Entertainment! III in 1994. She was awarded the National Medal of the Arts and Humanities in 2006.

== Early life ==
Cyd Charisse was born Tula Ellice Finklea in Amarillo, Texas, the daughter of Lela (née Norwood) and Ernest Enos Finklea Sr., who was a jeweler. Her nickname "Sid" was taken from her older brother Ernest E. Finklea Jr., who tried to say "Sis". It was later given the spelling of "Cyd" by Arthur Freed.

She was a sickly girl who started dancing lessons at six to build up her strength after a bout of polio. At 12 she studied ballet in Los Angeles with Adolph Bolm and Bronislava Nijinska, and at 14 she auditioned for and subsequently danced in the Ballet Russe de Monte-Carlo as "Felia Siderova" and, later, "Maria Istomina". She was educated at the Hollywood Professional School.

During a European tour, she met up again with Nico Charisse, a young dancer she had studied with for a time in Los Angeles. They married in Paris in 1939 and had a son, Nicky.

== Career ==
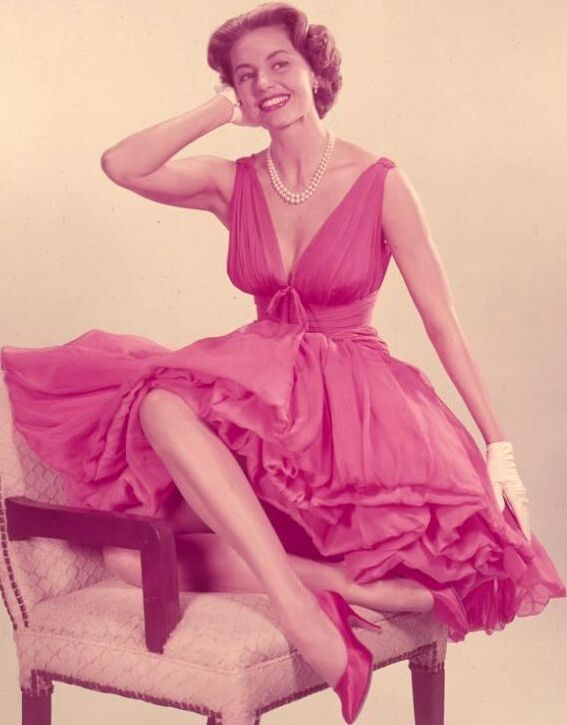
Studio publicity photo of Charisse

=== Early films ===
Charisse appeared uncredited in some films like Escort Girl (1941) and was in a short for Warner Bros, The Gay Parisian (1942).

The outbreak of World War II led to the closing of the ballet company, and when Charisse returned to Los Angeles, David Lichine offered her a dancing role in Gregory Ratoff's Something to Shout About (1943) at Columbia. This brought her to the attention of choreographer Robert Alton—who had also discovered Gene Kelly—and soon she joined the Freed Unit at Metro-Goldwyn-Mayer, where she became the resident MGM ballet dancer.

=== Early MGM roles ===
Charisse made some uncredited appearances in Mission to Moscow (1943) (as a ballet dancer) and Thousands Cheer (1943). She was loaned out to Warner Bros. for In Our Time (1944), playing a ballerina.

She was also featured as a ballerina in Ziegfeld Follies (produced in 1944 and released in 1946), dancing with Fred Astaire. Feedback was positive and Charisse was given her first speaking part supporting Judy Garland in the 1946 film The Harvey Girls.

She followed it with Three Wise Fools (1946), and she danced with Gower Champion to "Smoke Gets in Your Eyes" in Till the Clouds Roll By (1946). She also had a supporting role in the Esther Williams musical Fiesta (1947).

=== Rising fame ===
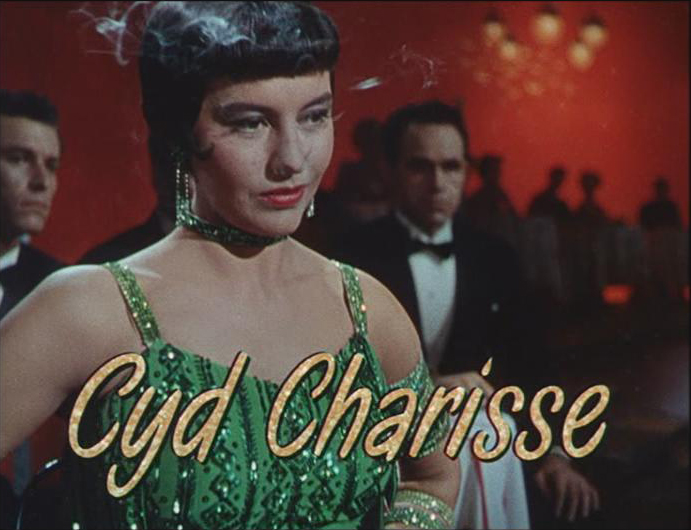
Charisse in Singin' in the Rain (1952)

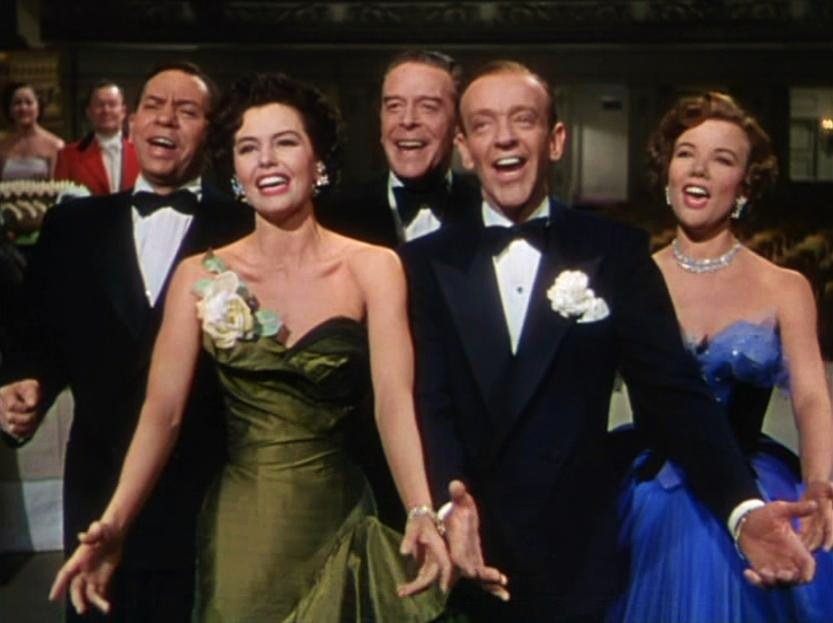
The cast of The Band Wagon (1953) L–R: Oscar Levant, Cyd Charisse, Jack Buchanan, Fred Astaire, and Nanette Fabray

Charisse was second billed in The Unfinished Dance (1947) with Margaret O'Brien, but the film was a box office flop. She had a good supporting part in On an Island with You (1948) with Esther Williams again and danced in The Kissing Bandit (1948). She had a supporting part in Words and Music (1948).

Charisse was given another opportunity in a "B" movie, Tension (1950), where she was third billed, but it was a box office disappointment. She was billed fifth in the prestigious East Side, West Side (1949) and was borrowed by Universal to play the female lead in The Mark of the Renegade (1951).

Back at MGM Charisse was the leading lady in The Wild North (1951) with Stewart Granger, which was a huge hit. Because Debbie Reynolds was not a trained dancer, Kelly chose Charisse to partner with him in the celebrated "Broadway Melody" ballet sequence from Singin' in the Rain (1952), which was acknowledged soon after its release as one of the greatest musicals of all time.

=== Stardom ===
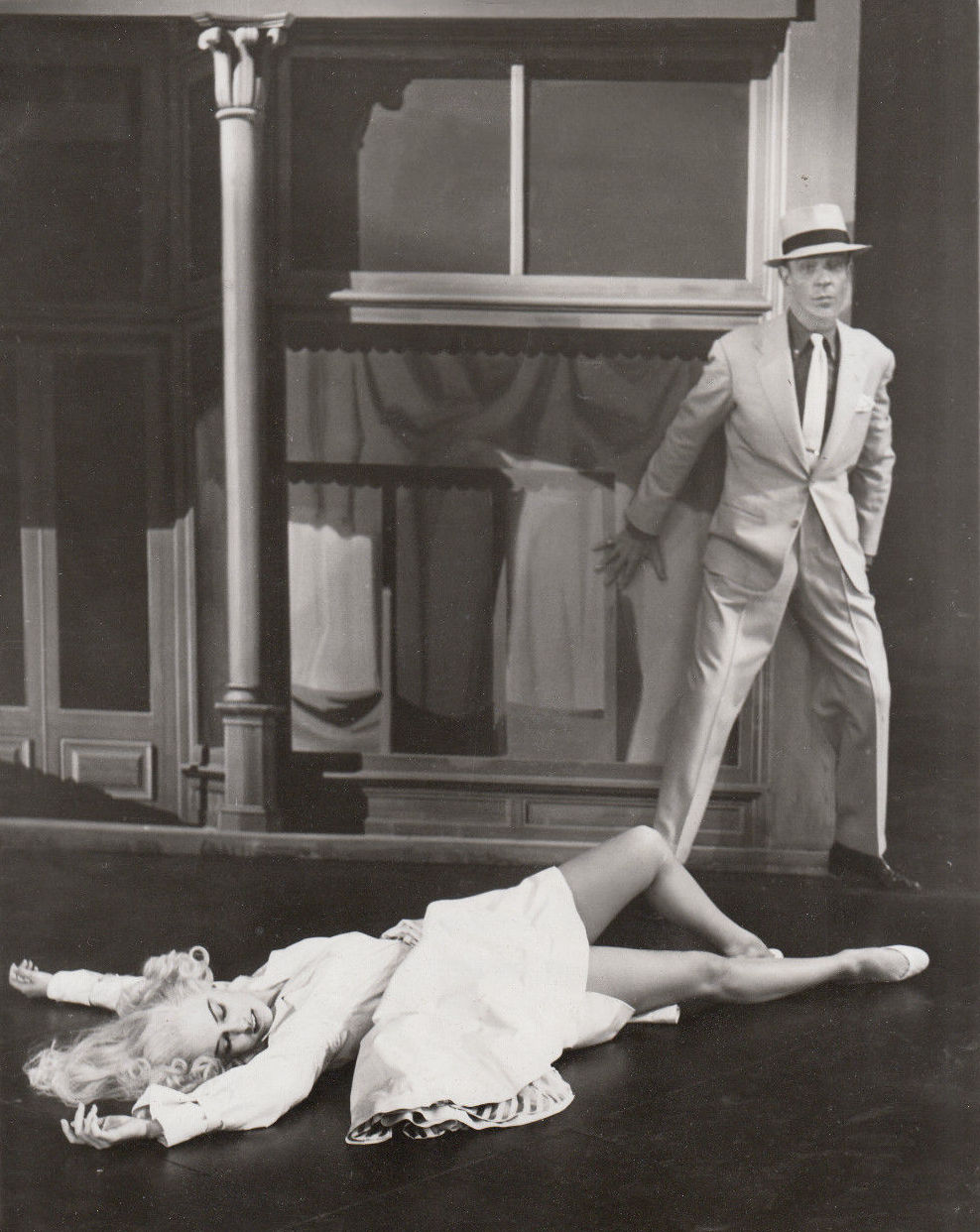
Charisse with Fred Astaire in The Band Wagon (1953)

Charisse had a significant role in Sombrero (1953) as well as the lead female role in The Band Wagon (1953), in which she danced with Astaire in the acclaimed "Dancing in the Dark" and "Girl Hunt Ballet" routines. Vincente Minnelli directed. Critic Pauline Kael said that "when the bespangled Charisse wraps her phenomenal legs around Astaire, she can be forgiven everything, even her three minutes of 'classical' ballet and the fact that she reads her lines as if she learned them phonetically." The film was later acknowledged as a classic but initially lost money for MGM.

Charisse had a cameo in Easy to Love (1953) and then co-starred with Kelly in the Scottish-themed musical film Brigadoon (1954), directed by Minnelli, another box office disappointment. She again took the lead female role (alongside Kelly) in It's Always Fair Weather (1955), which also lost money. In between she made an appearance in Deep in My Heart (1954).

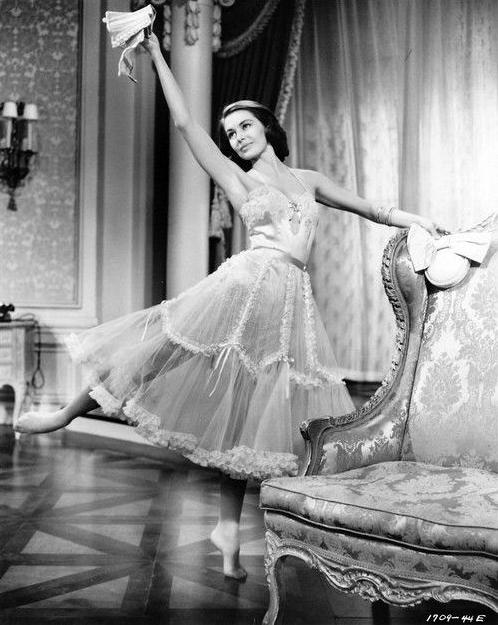
Publicity photo of Charisse for the film Silk Stockings (1957)

Charisse co-starred with Dan Dailey in Meet Me in Las Vegas (1956), which earned $3.7 million at the box office, with production costs of $2.4 million. She rejoined Astaire in the film version of Silk Stockings (1957), a musical remake of Ninotchka (1939), with Charisse taking over Greta Garbo's role. Astaire paid tribute to Charisse in his autobiography, calling her "beautiful dynamite" and writing: "That Cyd! When you've danced with her, you stay danced with.". Again, the film is now regarded as a classic MGM musical but it initially lost money for the studio.

In her autobiography Charisse reflected on her experience with Astaire and Kelly:

As one of the handful of girls who worked with both of those dance geniuses, I think I can give an honest comparison. In my opinion, Kelly is the more inventive choreographer of the two. Astaire, with Hermes Pan's help, creates fabulous numbers—for himself and his partner. But Kelly can create an entire number for somebody else ... I think, however, that Astaire's coordination is better than Kelly's ... his sense of rhythm is uncanny. Kelly, on the other hand, is the stronger of the two. When he lifts you, he lifts you! ... To sum it up, I'd say they were the two greatest dancing personalities who were ever on screen. But it's like comparing apples and oranges. They're both delicious.

Charisse had a slightly unusual dramatic role in Party Girl (1958), in which she played a showgirl who becomes involved with gangsters and a crooked lawyer, although it did include two dance routines. It was far more profitable for MGM than her musicals.

She went to Universal to co-star with Rock Hudson in Twilight for the Gods (1958).

MGM wanted Charisse for the role of Eve Kendall in 1959's North by Northwest, but Alfred Hitchcock wanted Eva Marie Saint.

=== 1960s ===
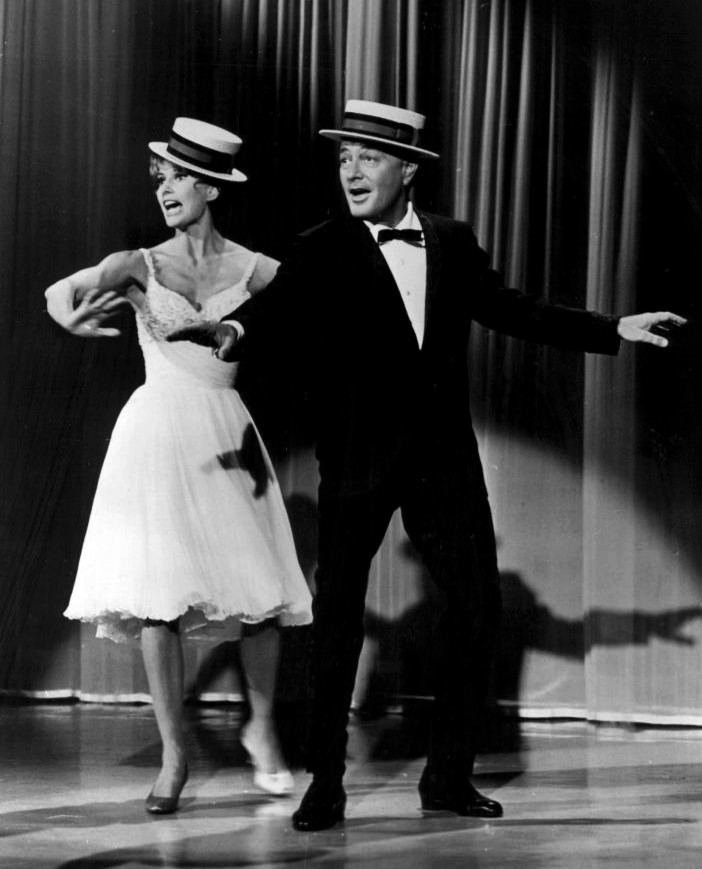
Charisse and her husband Tony Martin performing on the TV program The Hollywood Palace in 1964

After the decline of the Hollywood musical in the late 1950s, Charisse retired from dancing but continued to appear in film and TV productions from the 1960s through the 1990s. She went to Europe to make Five Golden Hours (1961) and Minnelli's Two Weeks in Another Town.

She had a supporting role in the unfinished film Something's Got to Give (1962) with Marilyn Monroe and Dean Martin. She did Assassination in Rome (1965) in Italy.

A striptease number by Charisse set to the movie's theme song opened the 1966 Dean Martin spy spoof, The Silencers, and she played a fashion magazine editor in the 1967 caper film Maroc 7.

She frequently performed dance numbers on TV variety series such as The Ed Sullivan Show and The Dean Martin Show, with seven appearances on The Hollywood Palace, a show she also hosted three times. She did Fol-de-Rol in 1968, which was filmed and broadcast in 1972.

=== 1970s and 1980s ===
In the 1970s and 1980s Charisse guest-starred on shows such as Medical Center, Hawaii Five-O, The Love Boat, Fantasy Island, The Fall Guy, Glitter, Murder, She Wrote, and Crazy Like a Fox.

She had a cameo in Won Ton Ton, the Dog Who Saved Hollywood (1976) and played Atsil, an Atlantean high priestess, in the 1978 fantasy film Warlords of Atlantis.

Charisse was in the TV movies Portrait of an Escort (1980) and Swimsuit (1989).

She also made cameo appearances in the music videos for Blue Mercedes's "I Want to Be Your Property" (1987) and Janet Jackson's "Alright" (1990).

=== Later career ===
Charisse appeared on Broadway from late 1991 as a replacement for Liliane Montevecchi in Grand Hotel. Her last film appearance was in 1994 in That's Entertainment! III as one of the on-screen presenters in a tribute to the great MGM musical films. She appeared in episodes of Burke's Law and Frasier in 1995 before retiring from acting. Her final appearance was in the TV movie Empire State Building Murders, which aired two months after her death in 2008.

== Later years ==
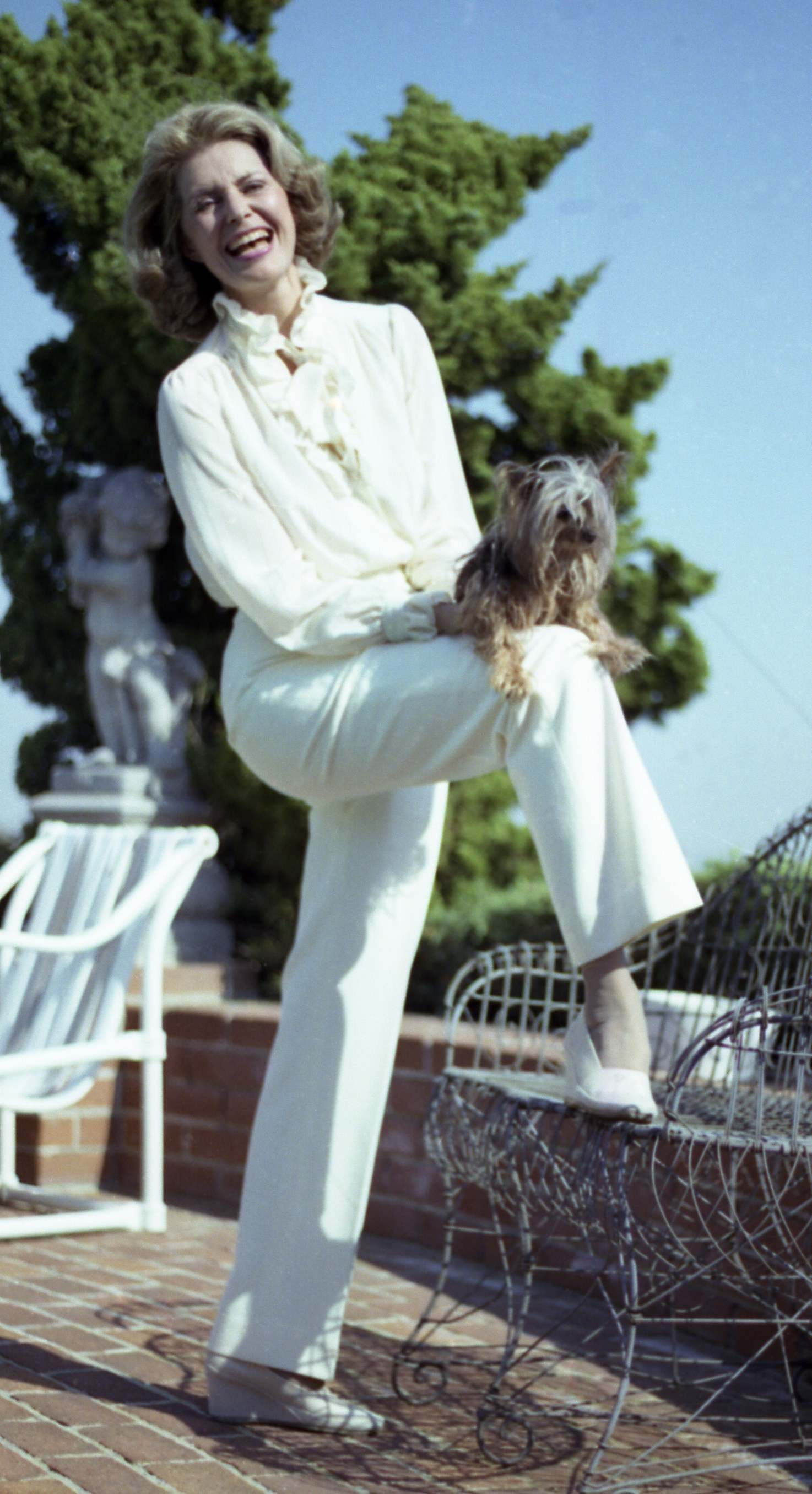
Charisse in 1987

In 1976 Charisse and her husband Tony Martin wrote their joint memoirs with Dick Kleiner entitled The Two of Us (1976). In 1990 following similar moves by MGM colleagues Debbie Reynolds and Angela Lansbury, Charisse produced the exercise video Easy Energy Shape Up, targeted for active senior citizens. She made her Broadway debut in 1989 in the musical version of Grand Hotel as the aging ballerina, Elizaveta Grushinskaya. In her eighties Charisse made occasional public appearances and appeared frequently in documentaries spotlighting the golden age of Hollywood.

She was featured in the 2001 Guinness Book of World Records under "Most Valuable Legs" because a $5 million insurance policy was reportedly issued on her legs in 1952.

== Personal life ==
Charisse's first husband, whose surname she kept, was Greek-born Nico Charisse; they were married in 1939 and had a son, Nico "Nicky" Charisse, before divorcing in 1947. In 1948 Charisse married singer Tony Martin and remained married to him until her death in 2008. They had a son, Tony Martin, Jr.

Her daughter-in-law is actress and model Liv Lindeland, who was married to Tony Martin, Jr. until his death in 2011. Her other daughter-in-law Sheila Charisse, wife of first son Nicky Charisse, died in the crash of American Airlines Flight 191 on May 25, 1979. Charisse, like her husband Tony Martin, Sr., was a staunch Republican and campaigned for Barry Goldwater in the 1964 United States presidential election and Richard Nixon in 1968. She was the aunt of the actress Nana Visitor.

== Death ==
Charisse was admitted to Cedars-Sinai Medical Center in Los Angeles, California, on June 16, 2008, after suffering an apparent heart attack. She died the following day at age 86. She was a practicing Methodist, but due to her husband's religion she was buried at Hillside Memorial Park Cemetery, a Jewish cemetery in Culver City, California, following a Methodist ceremony.

== Honors ==
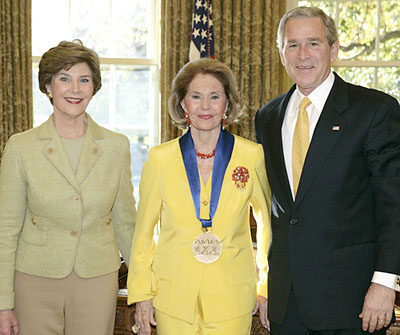
Charisse with George W. and Laura Bush, accepting the National Medal of Arts and Humanities Award in 2006. Photo by Paul Morse

On November 9, 2006, in a private White House ceremony, President George W. Bush presented Cyd Charisse with the National Medal of the Arts and Humanities, the highest official U.S. honor available in the arts.

== Filmography ==
=== Features ===
Year	Title	Role	Notes
1941	Escort Girl	Flamenco Dancer	Uncredited
1943	Something to Shout About	Lily	
1943	Mission to Moscow	Galina Ulanova – Ballerina	Uncredited
1943	Thousands Cheer	Dancer in Don Loper Number	Uncredited
1944	In Our Time	Ballerina	Uncredited
1945	Ziegfeld Follies	Ballerina ('Beauty')	
1946	The Harvey Girls	Deborah Andrews	
1946	Three Wise Fools	Rena Fairchild	
1946	Till the Clouds Roll By	Dance Specialty	Segment: "Roberta"
1947	Fiesta	Conchita	
1947	The Unfinished Dance	Mlle. Ariane Bouchet	
1948	On an Island with You	Yvonne Torro	
1948	The Kissing Bandit	Dancer	
1948	Words and Music	Margo Grant	
1949	East Side, West Side	Rosa Senta	
1950	Tension	Mary Chanler	
1951	The Mark of the Renegade	Manuella de Vasquez	
1952	The Wild North	Indian Girl	
1952	Singin' in the Rain	The long-legged woman in the green sequined dress	
1953	Sombrero	Lola de Torrano	
1953	The Band Wagon	Gabrielle Gerard	
1953	Easy to Love	Girl in Blue Swimsuit (cameo)	Uncredited
1954	Brigadoon	Fiona Campbell	
1954	Deep in My Heart	Performer in 'The Desert Song'	
1955	It's Always Fair Weather	Jackie Leighton	
1956	Meet Me in Las Vegas	Maria Corvier	
1957	Silk Stockings	Ninotchka Yoschenko	
1958	Twilight for the Gods	Charlotte King	
1958	Party Girl	Vicki Gaye	
1960	Black Tights	The Wife	
1961	Five Golden Hours	Baroness Sandra	
1962	Two Weeks in Another Town	Carlotta	
1962	Something's Got To Give	Bianca Arden	Unfinished
1965	Assassination in Rome	Shelley North	
1966	The Silencers	Sarita	
1967	Maroc 7	Louise Henderson	
1972	Film Portrait	Herself	Documentary
1976	Won Ton Ton, the Dog Who Saved Hollywood	President's Girl 4	
1978	Warlords of Atlantis	Atsil	
1989	Visioni private	Herself	
1994	That's Entertainment! III	Herself	Documentary

=== Short subjects ===
Year	Title	Role	Notes
1941	Rhumba Serenade	Dancer	
1941	Poeme	Dancer	
1941	I Knew It Would Be This Way	Dancer	
1941	Did Anyone Call?	Dancer	
1942	Magic of Magnolias	Dancer	
1942	The Gay Parisian	Dancer	Uncredited
1942	This Love of Mine	Singer	Uncredited
1955	1955 Motion Picture Theatre Celebration	Herself	Uncredited

=== Television ===
Year	Title	Role	Notes
1956	What's My Line?	Herself	Tribute episode to Fred Allen
1961	Checkmate	Janine Caree	Episode: "Dance of Death"
1972	Fol-de-Rol	Performer	
1975	Medical Center	Valerie	Episode: "No Way Home"
1978	Hawaii Five-O	Alicia Warren	Episode: "Death Mask"
1979	The Love Boat	Eve Mills	Episode: "April's Return/Super Mom/I'll See You Again"
1979	Fantasy Island	Queen Delphia	Episode: "The Flight of the Great Yellow Bird/The Island of Lost Women"
1980	Portrait of an Escort	Sheilah Croft	TV Movie
1983	Fantasy Island	Julie Mars	Episode: "Roarke's Sacrifice/The Butler's Affair"
1984	Swimsuit	Mrs. Allison	TV Movie
1984	The Fall Guy	Diana	Episode: "The Huntress"
1984	Glitter	Ethel Woodley	Episode: "In Tennis, Love Means Nothing"
1985	Murder, She Wrote	Myrna Montclair LeRoy	Episode: "Widow, Weep for Me"
1986	Crazy Like a Fox	Barbara Carlisle	Episode: "Hyde-and-Seek"
1989	Swimsuit	Mrs. Allison	TV Movie
1995	Frasier	Polly (voice)	Episode: "The Adventures of Bad Boy and Dirty Girl"
1995	Burke's Law	Amanda Richardson	Episode: "Who Killed the Highest Bidder?"
2008	Empire State Building Murders	Vicky Adams	TV Movie

== Theater ==
- Les Poupées de Paris (1962) (voice only)
- A Two Act Revue (1964)
- Illya Darling (1968)
- Can-Can (1969)
- Damn Yankees (1969)
- Fool’s Paradise (1970)
- No, No, Nanette (1972)
- Greenwich Village Follies of 1923 (1981)
- Cactus Flower (1983)
- Charlie Girl (1986)
- Grand Hotel (Dec 31, 1991 to Apr 25, 1992)

== Music videos ==
- "I Want to Be Your Property" by Blue Mercedes (1987)
- "Alright" by Janet Jackson (1990)
