= Strategic Air Command (film) =

1955 film by Anthony Mann

- Theatrical release poster
- Directed by: Anthony Mann
- Screenplay by: Valentine Davies; Beirne Lay Jr.
- Story by: Beirne Lay Jr.
- Produced by: Samuel J. Briskin
- Starring: James Stewart; June Allyson; Frank Lovejoy; Barry Sullivan; Alex Nicol; Bruce Bennett
- Cinematography: William H. Daniels
- Edited by: Eda Warren
- Music by: Victor Young
- Production company: Paramount Pictures
- Distributed by: Paramount Pictures
- Release date: March 25, 1955
- Running time: 114 minutes
- Country: United States
- Language: English
- Box office: $6.5 million (U.S. and Canada rentals)

Strategic Air Command is a 1955 American military aviation war drama film starring James Stewart and June Allyson, directed by Anthony Mann, and released by Paramount Pictures. It was the first of four Hollywood films that depicted the role of the Strategic Air Command in the Cold War era.

Strategic Air Command was the second film released in Paramount's new widescreen format, VistaVision, in color by Technicolor and Perspecta pseudo-stereo sound. It would also be Stewart and Mann's eighth and final collaboration and the last of three films that paired Jimmy Stewart and June Allyson, the others being The Stratton Story and The Glenn Miller Story.

== Plot ==
In 1952, Robert "Dutch" Holland (Note: "Dutch" Holland is referred to by his given name once – by Sally's father, a Protestant minister – in the film's opening scenes; he is referred to by his nickname thereafter, although "Robert" also appears on his desk nameplate. The fictional character is no relation to the real-life major leaguer Robert "Dutch" Holland.) is a professional baseball player with the St. Louis Cardinals. A B-29 bomber pilot in the Pacific theater during World War II, Holland retains a commission as a lieutenant colonel in the United States Air Force Reserve, but is on inactive, non-drilling status.

During spring training at Al Lang Field in St. Petersburg, Florida, he is visited by a former World War II squadron mate, now-Major General "Rusty" Castle, who is visiting nearby MacDill AFB in Tampa, Florida for meetings. Inviting Rusty to a party that Dutch and his wife, Sally, are hosting at their St. Petersburg home that evening, Rusty informs Dutch that he is being recalled to active duty for 21 months, a decision that was made well above Rusty's level. Dutch subsequently reports to his posting at Carswell Air Force Base, a bomber base in Fort Worth, Texas, to qualify in the Convair B-36. He arrives in a civilian business suit, for which he is later rebuked by General Hawkes, the commander of SAC who is making a no-notice inspection of Carswell, and replies that his uniforms are "the wrong color" (i.e., implying that Dutch has been inactive at least since the Air Force replaced the brown United States Army Air Forces uniform with a distinctive blue service dress uniform, which had occurred years earlier in 1949). (Note: The General's character is clearly patterned after the real SAC commander of the time, General Curtis LeMay.)

Holland is given a staff job with the 11th Bombardment Wing at Carswell that involves a lot of flying. He soon has a B-36 crew of his own, selecting a former World War II colleague as his flight engineer, and becomes enamored with both flying and the role of SAC in deterring war. He is joined by Sally, who had not bargained on being an Air Force wife, and who struggles with his repeated absences and the dangers of military flying. On any given night, Holland might find his aircraft on airborne alert far from the continental United States, in secret, only telling his wife when he returns days later. Even so, Sally tells Dutch that she is happy as long as they can be together, no matter what he decides to do with his life.

The B-36 is a complex aircraft when introduced, but improvements are under constant development. One challenge was leakage from the fuel tanks, but a new fix is introduced to permanently resolve the issue. On their next flight, Holland's crew has to fly their B-36 from Carswell AFB to Thule Air Base, Greenland. The fix does not work and one of the engines bursts into flame, causing the entire left wing to catch fire. The crew is forced to abandon the aircraft and bail out over the ice and snow of Greenland before arriving at Thule while Holland and his radar navigator stay on board for a forced landing on the Greenland ice cap, which causes Holland to injure his right shoulder.

Holland becomes a favorite of General Hawkes, and he is rewarded with a revised assignment flying the new Boeing B-47 Stratojet at MacDill Air Force Base, across the bay from St. Petersburg where his old baseball team continues to conduct its spring training. Promoted to "full bird" colonel (O-6) and made deputy wing commander of his B-47 wing at MacDill AFB, Dutch decides, to Sally's displeasure, to remain in the Air Force, rather than return to baseball at the end of his active duty obligation.

On a full B-47 wing deployment exercise that involves flying nonstop from MacDill to Yokota Air Base in Japan, Dutch's crew encounters severe wind and storms. Low on fuel, they divert to Kadena Air Base, Okinawa. As they prepare to land, Holland realizes that his shoulder injury from the B-36 crash was worse than he thought, and his arm is almost immobile. He is unable to operate the engine power levers (throttles) during final landing phase, and he has to rely on his co-pilot to do so, while Holland works the flight controls with his left arm and both feet.

This injury bars Holland from further military flying and also appears to threaten his professional baseball career. Following the near-mishap, Dutch is ordered to report to General Hawkes at SAC Headquarters at Offutt AFB, Nebraska. General Hawkes chastises Dutch for flying the MacDill to Yokota mission with a debilitating physical condition but also commends him for his service and devotion to SAC's mission. General Hawkes advises Dutch that he can remain in the Air Force, but it would be limited to a non-flying staff officer capacity, which Dutch declines, accepting a medical release from active duty instead. General Hawkes tells Dutch that he doesn't blame him for declining but reminds Dutch that he plus the thousands of other Air Force Reservists who have been recalled to active duty with SAC for roughly two-year periods has been essential for SAC executing its deterrence mission and that Dutch's time with SAC was a major part of the command's success. Given Dutch's shoulder injury likely negating his return to a career as a Major League Baseball player, General Hawkes suggests that he would make an excellent team manager and the St. Louis Cardinals ball club should consider him for such. The film closes with General Hawkes pointing out his office window at a fly-by of the newest combat-qualified wing of B-47s as Dutch and Sally look on.

== Cast ==
- James Stewart as Lieutenant Colonel (later Colonel) Robert R. "Dutch" Holland
- June Allyson as Sally Holland
- Frank Lovejoy as General Ennis C. Hawkes
- James Millican as Major General 'Rusty' Castle
- Bruce Bennett as Colonel (later Brigadier General) Espy
- Barry Sullivan as Lieutenant Colonel Rocky Samford
- Alex Nicol as Major I. K. "Ike" Knowland
- Jay C. Flippen as Tom Dolan, manager of the St. Louis Cardinals
- Harry Morgan as Master Sergeant Bible, a B-36 flight engineer.

== Production ==
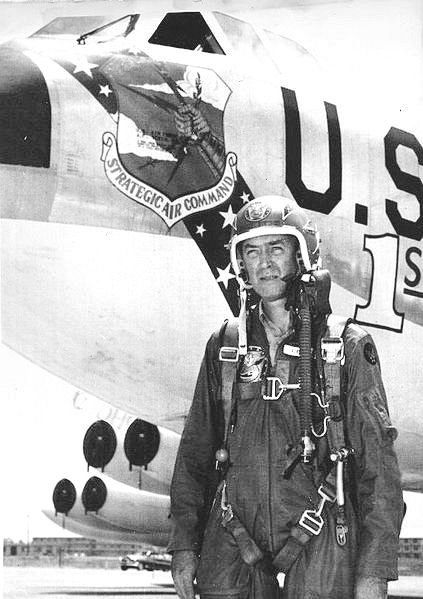
Stewart seen later in his Air Force career with a B-52.

In real life, during World War II, Stewart had been an Army Air Forces B-17 instructor pilot, a B-24 squadron commander, and a bomb group operations officer, completing 20 combat missions over Europe and having been twice awarded the Distinguished Flying Cross. At the time of filming, Stewart, much like the character he portrays, was also a colonel in the Air Force Reserve, serving with the Strategic Air Command when on duty and at the time was qualified as a pilot on the B-47, although much of the B-47 flying in the film was performed by his friend and fellow Air Force pilot, Major (later Colonel) A.W. Blizzard Jr.

Stewart's military service and lifelong interest in aviation greatly influenced the making of the film. He pushed for an authentic but sympathetic portrayal of the Strategic Air Command, which led Paramount to put together a strong cast of Hollywood veterans and production people including June Allyson, Frank Lovejoy, director Anthony Mann, and the top stunt pilot of the day, Paul Mantz. The film accurately portrays (from the perspective of the 1952 starting point of the script) the duties and responsibilities of an Air Force strategic bomber pilot, and the demands such service places on family life.

Mann later said the film, "...was to promote the Air Force and the idea of SAC which in itself had its own restrictions, just being a military subject. Therefore, the cooperation of the Air Force was vital, and we were held within the bounds of what they wanted. The story itself was restricted and the whole concept of its shooting was confined to what they would let me show, which is perfectly all right. I went into it purely as a service to the Air Force, and as Jimmy Stewart was of the Force, we accepted this handicap and just tried to make an exciting film, not out of the characters which were paper-mache, but out of the B-36 and B-47 - we tried to dramatic them as our two great characters."

The film includes dramatic aerial photography, credited to Thomas Tutwiler, for which it was awarded a special citation by the American National Board of Review. It is also the only motion picture to highlight the Convair B-36 (depicted in the theatrical release poster), the largest mass-produced piston-powered aircraft ever built, and the first bomber for the hydrogen bomb. The propeller-driven B-36 was then near the end of its service life and was about to be replaced by the jet-powered B-47 Stratojet, followed by the Boeing B-52 Stratofortress. The aerial footage was accompanied by a dramatic and soaring musical score composed by Victor Young.

The film was made with the full cooperation of the U.S. Air Force, and it was filmed partly on location at MacDill Air Force Base, Tampa, Florida; Lowry Air Force Base, Colorado, and Carswell Air Force Base, Texas.

The baseball scenes were filmed with the cooperation of the St. Louis Cardinals at their spring training home of Al Lang Field in St. Petersburg, Florida, just across Tampa Bay from MacDill AFB.

Stewart's character is based on the real-life military career and an actual mission flown by Brigadier General Clifford Schoeffler, who crashed during an Arctic B-36 mission and survived. Brigadier General Schoeffler was on site at Carswell Air Force Base during the filming of Strategic Air Command as a consultant.

Some commentators have speculated that the plot was inspired by Boston Red Sox legend Ted Williams, a World War II combat veteran and Marine Corps Reserve officer, who was recalled to active duty for Korean War service as a Naval Aviator with the U.S. Marine Corps at the height of his baseball career.

== Reception ==
The Storz Mansion in Omaha, Nebraska, was the scene of opulent parties celebrating the film. Its premiere was held in Omaha, the home of Offutt AFB and of SAC Headquarters. The premiere party was held at the Mansion, with guests that included Stewart and Allyson, as well as the Strategic Air Command commander, General Curtis LeMay.

Shot in the new VistaVision process, the film was the sixth highest-grossing film of 1955. Critics were lukewarm about the performances of all except for Stewart, who was called "capable", "charming", and "competent". Public reaction centered on the spectacular aerial footage, so much so that the B-36 and B-47 aircraft were arguably the real stars of the film. Its release led to a 25 percent increase in Air Force enlistments.

Strategic Air Command was later followed by two additional military aviation films that were also supportive of SAC's mission, Bombers B-52 (1957), and A Gathering of Eagles (1963).

The B-47 cockpit used in the film is now on display at the March Field Air Museum at March Air Reserve Base (former March AFB) in Riverside, California.

== Awards and nominations ==
Award	Category	Nominee(s)	Result	Ref.
Academy Awards	Best Motion Picture Story	Beirne Lay Jr.	Nominated	
National Board of Review Awards	Special Citation	For the aerial photography	Won	

== Home media ==
Strategic Air Command blu-ray from Olive Films

In October 2016, Strategic Air Command was released by Olive Films on DVD and Blu-ray.

== See also ==
- List of American films of 1955
