= Liliane Montevecchi =

French actress and entertainer

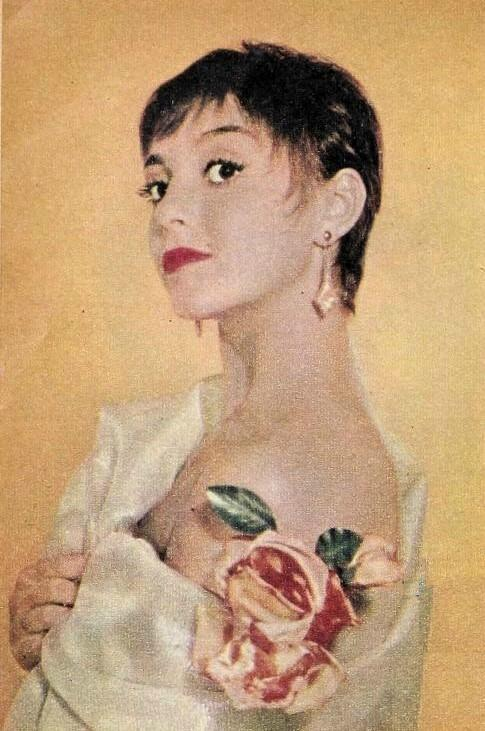
- Montevecchi photographed by Virgil Apger, for Photoplay, January 1956.
- Born: Liliane Dina Montevecchi; October 13, 1932; Paris, France
- Died: June 29, 2018 (aged 85); New York City, U.S.
- Education: Conservatoire de Paris
- Occupations: Actress; dancer; singer
- Years active: 1953–2018

Liliane Dina Montevecchi (October 13, 1932 – June 29, 2018) was a French actress, dancer, and singer. She won the Tony Award for Best Featured Actress in a Musical for her role in the original Broadway production of Nine, and was nominated for Best Actress in a Musical for Grand Hotel.

== Early life ==
Montevecchi was born on October 13, 1932 in the 15th arrondissement of Paris. Her father, Franco Montevecchi, was an Italian painter. Her mother, Janine Trinquet, was a hat designer. Her parents separated shortly after her birth, and she was raised mainly by her mother.

She began studying ballet at the age of 8 with primo ballerino Pierre Duprez. She finished her training at the Conservatoire de Paris, under Jeanne Schwarz and Mathilde Kschessinska, and performed at the Opéra Comique. She made her professional debut at the Théâtre des Champs-Elysées, in a ballet by David Lichine. In 1949, she performed at the coronation of Monaco's Prince Rainier III. She also danced her first steps at the Casino de Paris with Jean Guélis.

== Career ==
Montevecchi began her international career as a prima ballerina in Roland Petit's dance company. She appeared in The Glass Slipper with Michael Wilding and Daddy Long Legs (with Fred Astaire), in both of which she was acting with leading lady Leslie Caron. In the mid-1950s, she was signed to a contract by MGM, which cast her in various roles in such films as Moonfleet with Stewart Granger and Meet Me in Las Vegas with Cyd Charisse and John Brascia. She then played in the Jerry Lewis vehicle The Sad Sack, King Creole with Elvis Presley, and The Young Lions with Montgomery Clift, Dean Martin and Marlon Brando. She knew Gene Kelly, Elizabeth Taylor and Clark Gable, and she took classes at the Actors Studio in New York.

Montevecchi replaced Colette Brosset in the 1958 Broadway revue La Plume de Ma Tante. After some television work in series such as Playhouse 90 and Adventures in Paradise at the end of the decade, Montevecchi opted to leave Hollywood for a star spot in the Folies Bergère in Las Vegas, toured with the company for nine years before appearing at the Folies Bergère in Paris from 1972 to 1978. In 1982, she drew the attention of critics and audiences for her performance in Nine, with Raúl Juliá, for which she won both the Tony and Drama Desk Award for Best Featured Actress in a Musical. Seven years later, she starred in Grand Hotel, earning a Tony nomination for Best Actress in a Musical.

On TV, she guests–starred in more than 20 shows. Montevecchi also appeared in the films Wall Street and How to Lose a Guy in 10 Days with Matthew McConaughey. She appeared in concert at Carnegie Hall and Lincoln Center and toured internationally with her semi-autobiographical shows On the Boulevard and Back on the Boulevard. Her solo album On the Boulevard is available from Jay Records. She is featured in the recording of the 1985 concert version of Follies staged at Avery Fisher Hall, and she has starred in musicals such as Irma La Douce, Gigi and Hello Dolly!.

In 1998, she replaced Eartha Kitt as The Wicked Witch of the West in Radio City Entertainment's touring production of The Wizard of Oz, co-starring Mickey Rooney as The Wizard and Jessica Grové as Dorothy. She continued with the show until the spring of 1999 and was succeeded by Jo Anne Worley.

In 2001, Montevecchi appeared as Mistinguett at the Théâtre National de l’Opéra Comique in Paris.

In Seattle, Washington, D.C., and San Francisco, Montevecchi had a very successful turn as Madame ZinZanni at Teatro ZinZanni beginning with the production at its opening, with Frank Ferrante, Michael Davis (juggler), Les Castors, Dreya Weber, Mat Plendl and the Steben Twins. She took part in the recording of the album The Divas with Joan Baez, Thelma Houston, Sally Kellerman, Christine Deaver, Debbie de Coudreaux, Francine Reed, Juliana Rambaldi and Kristin Clayton in 2006.

She returned to Teatro ZinZanni in June 2009 to reprise the role and in September 2011 in the show Bonsoir Liliane!, starring with Kevin Kent, directed by Tommy Tune and choreographed by Tobias Larsson.

In December 2010, Kaye Ballard, Montevecchi and Donna McKechnie starred in From Broadway with Love, directed by Richard Jay-Alexander and staged at the Lensic Theater. In early 2012, she joined Kaye Ballard and Lee Roy Reams for the musical review Doin' It for Love, directed by David Geist.

In March 2015, Montevecchi won critical praise for recreating her Tony-nominated role of Grushinskaya in Grand Hotel: The 25th Anniversary Reunion Concert at 54 Below in New York City.

In November 2015, at the behest of producer Patrick Niedo, Montevecchi brought her solo show Aller-Retour (Round Trip) to Paris for the first time.

On July 12, 2017, she joined Francesca Capetta and Stacy Sullivan for a birthday salute to the late film star and recording artist Dean Martin in the Weill Recital Hall at New York’s Carnegie Hall.

== Death ==
Montevecchi died on June 29, 2018, at age 85. A memorial service was held July 6, 2018, at Gotham Hall in New York City and she was buried in Gambais, France.

== Awards and nominations ==
In 1982, Montevecchi won both the Tony and Drama Desk Award for Best Featured Actress in a Musical for her performance as Liliane La Fleur in Nine.

She earned a Tony nomination for Best Actress in a Musical for her performance as Elizaveta Grushinskaya in Grand Hotel in 1990.

She was honored by the French Minister of Culture as the "Officer of Arts and Culture" to France and the world at large in 2013.

In January 2017, Montevecchi was given the Lifetime Achievement Award by the Ziegfeld Society of New York City.

== Filmography and roles ==
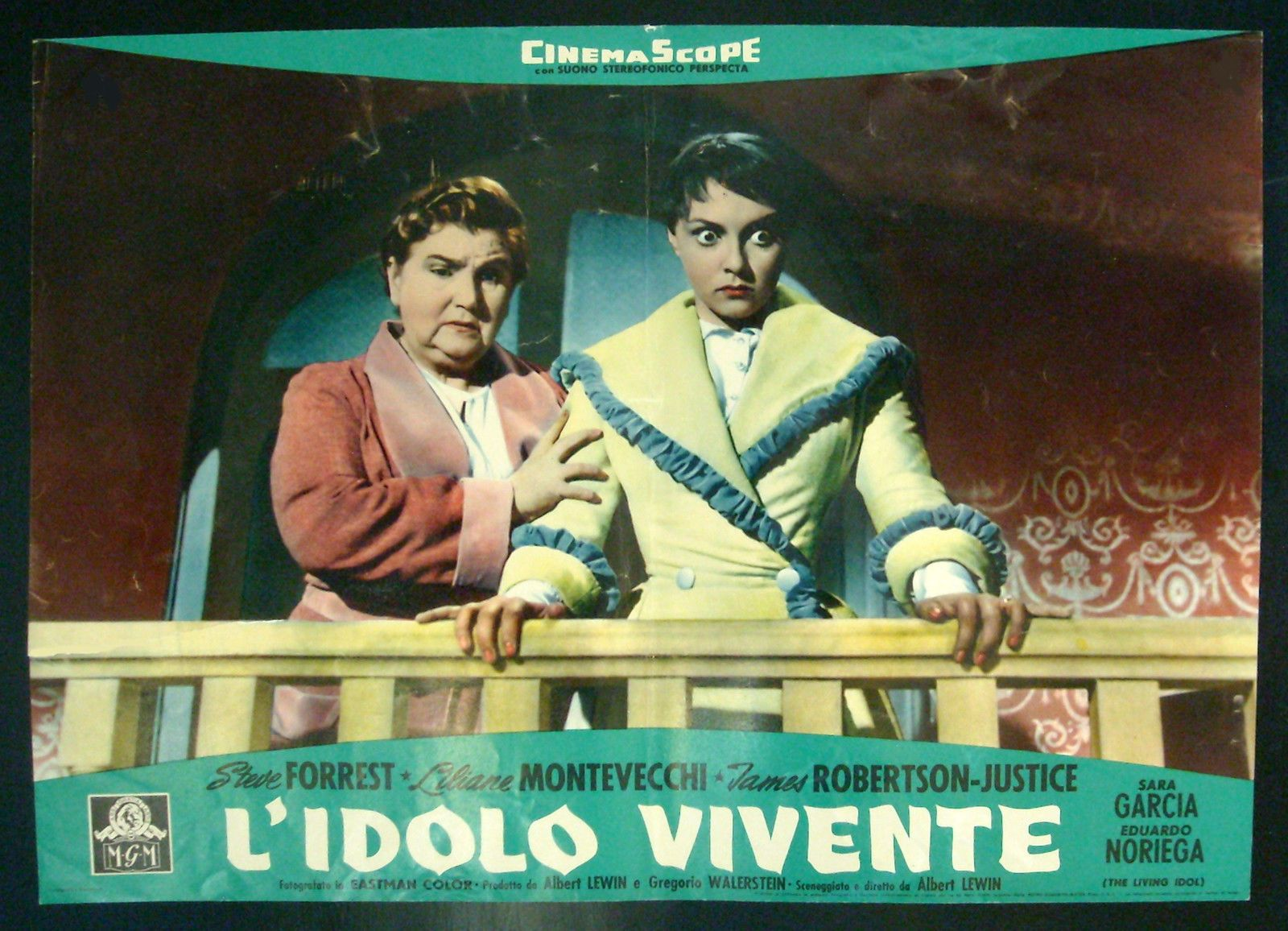
Montevecchi along with Sara García in The Living Idol (1957)

- Women of Paris (1953) as Une Femme de Paris (as Montevecchi)
- The Glass Slipper (1955) as Tehara
- Daddy Long Legs (1955) as College Girl (uncredited)
- Moonfleet (1955) (as Liliane Montevecchi of the Ballet de Paris) as Gypsy
- Meet Me in Las Vegas (1956) (a.k.a. Viva Las Vegas!) (UK) as Lilli
- The Living Idol (1957) (a.k.a. El Ídolo viviente) (Mexico) as Juanita
- The Sad Sack (1957) as Zita
- The Young Lions (1958) as Françoise
- King Creole (1958) as Forty Nina
- Me and the Colonel (1958) as Cosette
- 77 Sunset Strip (1959, TV series) as Tosca
- Behind Closed Doors (1959, TV Series) as Marcella
- Playhouse 90 (1959, TV series) as Estrella / Carla
- Adventures in Paradise (1959, TV Series) as Therese Privaux
- The Tab Hunter Show (1960–1961, TV series) as Andrea / Maria
- Mr. Broadway (1964, TV series) as Vici
- T.H.E. Cat (1967, TV series) as Countess De Laurent
- It Takes a Thief (1969, TV Series) as Madame Tanya Varhos
- 39° Gala de l'Union des Artistes at the cirque d'hiver in Paris (1972)
- La vie rêvée de Vincent Scotto (1973, TV movie) as Gay Deslys
- Musidora (1973, TV movie) as Musidora
- Au théâtre ce soir (1974, TV series) as Francine
- Chobizenesse (1975) (a.k.a. Show Business, English title) as Gigi Nietzsche
- Wall Street (1987) as Woman at 'Le Cirque'
- The Funny Face of Broadway (1997, documentary by Rémy Batteault)
- Of Penguins and Peacocks (2000, TV movie) as Sarah Bernhardt
- Mistinguett, la dernière revue (2001, TV movie) as Mistinguett
- An Evening with Rosanne Seaborn (2001, TV movie) as Mrs. Mannering
- L'Idole (2002) (a.k.a. The Idol, English title) as Nicole
- How to Lose a Guy in 10 Days (2003) as Mrs. DeLauer
- Comment j'ai accepté ma place parmi les mortels (2008, short) as Mirna
- Jours de France (2016) (a.k.a. 4 Days in France, English title) as Judith Joubert (final film role)

== Stage work ==
- La Croqueuse de Diamants (1952), Théâtre de l’Empire, Paris, France
- La Plume de Ma Tante, original Broadway production (1958), Broadway
- La Grosse Valse (1962-1963), Théâtre des Variétés, Paris, France as Nana
- Folies Bergère, original Broadway production (1964), Broadway
- Nine, original Broadway production (1982), Broadway as Liliane La Fleur
- Gotta Getaway! (1984) Radio City Music Hall, New York
- Irma La Douce (1986) with Robert Clary, Atlantic City
- Star Dust, concert reading (1987), New York
- On the Boulevard (1988), Kaufman Theatre, New York
- Nymph Errant, London concert revival (1989), West End, London, UK
- Grand Hotel, original Broadway production (1989), Broadway as Elizaveta Grushinskaya
- Grand Hotel, national tour (1992), US Tour
- Nine, London concert revival (1992), West End, London, UK as Liliane La Fleur
- Grand Hotel, London production (1992), West End, London, UK as Elizaveta Grushinskaya
- Hello, Dolly! (1995), Opéra Royal de Wallonie, Liège, Belgium
- Gigi (1996) with Gavin MacLeod, Paper Mill Playhouse, Millburn, New Jersey
- Back on the Boulevard (1996), Kaufman Theatre, New York
- Divorce Me, Darling!, Regional Revival (1997), UK
- Gigi (1998) with Gavin MacLeod, TX's Theatre Under the Stars, Houston, Texas
- Follies, Paper Mill Playhouse Revival (1998), Millburn, New Jersey as Solange Lafitte
- The Wizard of Oz, Radio City Entertainment's touring production (1998-1999) as The Wicked Witch of the West
- Mistinguett, la dernière revue (2001), Opéra Comique, Paris, France as Mistinguett
- Love, Chaos and Dinner (2002-2003), Teatro ZinZanni, San Francisco, California as Madame ZinZanni
- The Boy Friend, regional revival (2003), UK as Madame Dubonnet
- Love, Chaos and Dinner (2007), Teatro ZinZanni, Seattle, Washington as Madame ZinZanni
- A La Folie! (2008) with Michael Davis (juggler), Teatro ZinZanni, San Francisco, California
- Back on the Boulevard (2009), Pizza on the Park, London, UK
- Bottega ZinZanni : All Dressed Up with Some Place to Go (2009), Teatro ZinZanni, Seattle, Washington as Dina Monte
- Majestic (2009) with Les Castors, Palazzo, Vienna, Austria
- From Broadway With Love (2010) with Kaye Ballard & Donna McKechnie, Lensic Theater, Santa Fe, New Mexico
- Tigerplast Varieté Show (2011), Tigerpalast, Frankfurt, Germany
- Bonsoir Liliane! (2011), Teatro ZinZanni, Seattle, Washington
- Doin' It For Love (2012) with Kaye Ballard & Lee Roy Reams, Austin, TX & Wilshire Ebell Theatre, Los Angeles, California
- Broadway Babes ONE NIGHT ONLY (2014) with Kaye Ballard & Donna McKechnie, Albuquerque, New Mexico
- Zazou (2014), The York Theatre, New York
- Tigerplast Varieté Show (2014), Tigerpalast, Frankfurt, Germany
- Paris on the Thames (2015), Brasserie Zédel, London, UK
- 54 Sings Grand Hotel: The 25th Anniversary Concert (2015), Feinstein's/54 Below, New York as Elizaveta Grushinskaya
- An intimate evening with Liliane Montevecchi (2015), The Mansion Inn, Rock City Falls, New York
- Steve Ross on Broadway (2015), Birdland Jazz Club, New York
- A Classic Night: A Tribute to Liliane Montevecchi (2015), Alvin Ailey Theatre, New York
- Tigerplast Varieté Show (2015), Tigerpalast, Frankfurt, Germany
- Aller-Retour, musical review (2015), Vingtième Théâtre, Paris, France
- Concert les Funambules (2015), Sunset/Sunside, Paris, France
- Be My Valentine (2016), Feinstein's/54 Below, New York
- Liliane Montevecchi Live at Zédel (2016), Brasserie Zédel, London, UK
- Tigerplast Varieté Show (2016), Tigerpalast, Frankfurt, Germany
- Hotel l'Amour (2016) with Frank Ferrante, Teatro ZinZanni, Seattle, Washington
- Ziegfeld Follies of the Air: The New 1934 Live from Broadway Broadcast Revue (2017), Birdland Jazz Club, New York
- We'll Take a Glass Together: The Songs of Wright & Forrest from MGM to Grand Hotel (2017) with Karen Akers, Ida K. Lang Recital Hall at Hunter College, New York
- Francesca Capetta sings Dean Martin: A Centennial Celebration (2017), Carnegie Hall, New York

=== Other works ===
- The Hollywood Palace as herself - Singer / ... (3 episodes, 1965–1966) - Episode #4.10 (1966) TV episode as herself - Singer - Episode #3.19 (1966) TV episode as herself - Singer/Dancer - Episode #2.29 (1965) TV episode as herself - Singer/Dancer
- The 36th Annual Tony Awards (1982) (TV) as herself - Winner : Best Performance by a Featured Actress in a Musical
- The 37th Annual Tony Awards (1983) (TV) as herself - Presenter
- Follies in Concert (1986) (TV) as Solange Lafitte
- The 44th Annual Tony Awards (1990) (TV) as herself - Nominee: Best Actress in a Musical
- NBC's "The Tonight Show starring Johnny Carson" with Jay Leno - Season 29 (1991) (TV) as herself - Guest
- Tout le monde en parle as herself (1 episode, dated 28 April 2001)
- Broadway The Golden Age, by the Legends Who Were There (2003) as herself a.k.a. Broadway (USA: short title) a.k.a. Broadway: The Golden Age (USA: short title) a.k.a. Broadway: The Movie (USA: short title)

== Albums ==
- C'est beau l'amour à Paris/Grain de poivre, Versailles, 1981
- Nine: Original Cast Album (cast recording), Sony, 1982
- Follies in Concert (cast recording), RCA, 1985
- Nymph Errant, EMI, 1990
- Grand Hotel: The Musical - Broadway Cast Recording (cast recording), RCA, 1992
- Nine (1992 London Concert, cast recording), RCA, 1992
- There's No Business Like Show Business: Broadway Showstoppers, Sony, 1993
- Divorce Me Darling! (cast recording), Jay Records, 1998
- Follies - The Complete Recording (cast recording), Tee Vee Toons, 1998
- On the Boulevard (original cast), Jay Records, 1998
- La Tournée des Grands Ducs (various artists), Idol/Marianne Melodie, 2005
- The Divas, One Reel/Teatro ZinZanni, 2006
- BROADWAY: THE GREAT ORIGINAL CAST RECORDINGS, Masterworks Broadway, 2015
- Les Funambules (chansons d'amour pour tous), Blossom, 2017
