= Mark of the Renegade =

1951 film by Hugo Fregonese

- Film poster
- Directed by: Hugo Fregonese
- Screenplay by: Robert Hardy Andrews; Louis Solomon
- Based on: Don Renegade by Johnston McCulley
- Produced by: Jack J. Gross
- Starring: Ricardo Montalbán; Cyd Charisse
- Cinematography: Charles P. Boyle
- Edited by: Frank Gross
- Music by: Frank Skinner
- Color process: Technicolor
- Production company: Universal-International Pictures
- Distributed by: Universal Pictures
- Release dates: July 24, 1951 (Los Angeles); September 5, 1951 (New York)
- Running time: 81 minutes
- Country: United States
- Language: English

Mark of the Renegade is a 1951 American adventure Western film directed by Hugo Fregonese starring Ricardo Montalbán and Cyd Charisse. The film is based on the 1939 novel Don Renegade by Johnston McCulley and is set in Mexican-ruled Los Angeles in the 1820s.

== Plot ==
In 1825, after fleeing a pirate ship, Marcos Zappa is taken to meet Don Pedro Garcia, whose ambition is to become emperor of California for the Republic of Mexico. Garcia knows that Marcos bears an "R" mark beneath his bandana that identifies him as a renegade and traitor. Garcia schemes to have Marcos seduce and marry Manuella, the daughter of his rival Jose de Marquez, having been rejected as a suitor himself. However, Manuella is already engaged to Miguel De Gandara. Anita Gonzales, a gambling-house owner in league with Garcia, is angry when Marcos fails to succumb to her charms. Manuella is attracted to Marcos but not sure how much to trust him. He reveals the "R" brand as a demonstration of good faith. They spend a night together and her father insists that they marry.

At the wedding, Miguel jealously challenges Marcos to a duel. Anita exposes Marcos as a disloyal renegade, but it is revealed that the "R" brand is a fake, with Marcos working undercover to unearth Garcia's treachery. In a swordfight, Marcos kills Garcia and is then free to marry Manuella.

== Cast ==
- Ricardo Montalbán as Marcos Zappa
- Cyd Charisse as Manuella de Vasquez
- J. Carrol Naish as Luis
- Gilbert Roland as Don Pedro Garcia
- Andrea King as Anita Gonzales
- George Tobias as Captain Bardoso
- Antonio Moreno as Jose De Vasquez
- Georgia Backus as Duenna Concepcion
- Robert Warwick as Colonel Vega
- Armando Silvestre as Miguel De Gandara

== Release ==
The film's world premiere was a gala event held at the United Artists Theatre in Los Angeles on July 24, 1951 and sponsored by the Mexican consul general. Many Hollywood stars and public officials attended, and the proceeds were donated to local Mexican charities. Johnny Grant served as master of ceremonies for the stage show preceding the screening of the film.

== Reception ==
In a contemporary review for The New York Times, critic Bosley Crowther called the film "all just so much flapdoodle" and wrote: "'Mark of the Renegade,' quite frankly, is not a very impressive job. In fact, it is just about as banal as a Technicolored costume film can be. It is one of those overblown horse operas, set in California way back in the days of Spanish grandees and Mexican governors, before the territory was annexed. And it gallops and flops and loosely tumbles through such a confusion of sprawling cliches that it soon loses all rhyme and reason and becomes just an aimless exercise."

Critic Edwin Schallert of the Los Angeles Times wrote: "The ingredients of 'Mark of the Renegade' as a picture are not unique by any means, though they are slickly handled. Montalban gains opportunity for an interesting portrayal. ... 'Mark of the Renegade,' with its duels, jousts, and highly colored atmosphere, classifies as typical romantic release entertainment."

== Bibliography ==
- Blottner, Gene. Universal-International Westerns, 1947–1963: The Complete Filmography. McFarland, 2000.
