= The Wild North =

1952 film by Andrew Marton

- Theatrical film poster
- Directed by: Andrew Marton
- Written by: Frank Fenton
- Produced by: Stephen Ames
- Starring: Stewart Granger; Wendell Corey; Cyd Charisse
- Cinematography: Robert L. Surtees
- Edited by: John D. Dunning; George Boemler
- Music by: Bronislau Kaper
- Production company: Metro-Goldwyn-Mayer
- Distributed by: Loew's Inc.
- Release date: March 28, 1952
- Running time: 97 minutes
- Country: United States
- Language: English
- Budget: $1,282,000
- Box office: $4,007,000

The Wild North (also known as The Big North, Constable Pedley, The Constable Pedley Story, The Wild North Country and North Country) is a 1952 American Western film directed by Andrew Marton and starring Stewart Granger, Wendell Corey and Cyd Charisse. It was the first Ansco Color film shot.

== Plot ==
Jules Vincent, a French-Canadian trapper, while in a northern Canadian town, helps an attractive Indian singer, fend off unwanted attentions from a drunken Max Brody. The next day, Vincent sets off by canoe into the Canadian wilderness, taking the Indian girl up north to her tribe, now accompanied by a contrite Brody.

When only Vincent and the Indian girl arrive at her Chippewa village, Vincent tells the chief that Brody had acted recklessly by trying to run the rapids, and that he then tried to shoot Brody in the shoulder to graze it and frighten him, but that he accidentally killed Brody when the canoe pitched wildly and spoiled his aim. Intent on avoiding arrest for murder, Vincent heads alone into the wilderness. After North-West Mounted Police (NWMP) Constable Pedley arrives at the village on another matter, he learns about Brody's death.

Pedley finds Vincent's cabin where the Indian girl tells him that Vincent is not a murderer. The NWMP Constable, however, is determined to bring Vincent in, saying running away makes the trapper look guilty.

While on his trapline, Vincent finds a half-frozen Father Simon who had gone into the wilderness, to try to persuade the trapper to turn himself in. As Father Simon pleads with Vincent and utters his dying words, Pedley arrives to arrest Vincent. Despite Vincent's warnings that the weather will turn worse, Pedley takes Vincent into custody and starts a long trek back to the NWMP station.

During the treacherous trip, Vincent tries in vain to overpower Pedley, whom he nicknames "Bebi.” When two lost trappers, Ruger and Sloan menace them, offering Vincent a chance to escape, Pedley observes that they will know "how good a man" Vincent is. Vincent proves his character by helping to overpower the trappers and send them away. Later, Pedley's leg is badly injured when he steps in a trap. Vincent helps him break free. They face an avalanche and a wolf attack, and an unlikely bond slowly forms between the two men. Despite Vincent's efforts, Pedley deteriorates, mentally and physically, or as Vincent puts it, "blanking out". Although he could abandon Pedley to certain death by freezing, Vincent continues to support the constable, handcuffing him to the sled to keep him moving. Eventually, he abandons the sled and allows the dogs to lead a delirious Pedley to the cabin.

There, the Indian girl angrily asks Vincent why he saved the man who is sworn to take him to jail. Vincent tells her that he was saved by needing to accomplish the task of bringing Pedley to safety, and by his promise to do it. Pedley is so traumatized by the ordeal that he is unable to speak, despite Vincent and the girl's best efforts to revive him.

Shortly thereafter, while trying to discreetly buy provisions for the men at the general store, the Indian girl is approached by Callahan, who hands her some tobacco free of charge and warns her that the local sergeant is looking for the two men. He tells her that "while some men" might think Vincent and Pedley might have become lost and died in the wilderness, he knows better.

When she returns to the cabin, she finds Vincent still unable to break Pedley free from his fugue state. Vincent decides that the two men should travel down the river and brave the rapids in an attempt to shake Pedley out of his condition. The two men embark on a harrowing journey downriver in the canoe over treacherous rapids. Fearful for his life, Pedley finally begins speaking again, ordering Vincent to turn the canoe around, and when Vincent refuses, he tries to shoot him. The canoe capsizes, and the two men are thrown free, nearly drowning. As the two bedraggled men drag themselves to shore along the bank of the river, Pedley thanks Vincent.

At a court hearing, Pedley testifies about the events, including the canoe trip, and the magistrate orders Vincent released. As Vincent and the Indian girl depart, they give Pedley an orange kitten and tell him to "build a house around it." He names the kitten "Bebi," and with the kitten on his shoulder, watches the couple head down the river in a canoe, free.

== Cast ==
- Stewart Granger as Jules Vincent
- Wendell Corey as Constable Pedley
- Cyd Charisse as Indian Girl
- Morgan Farley as Father Simon
- J.M. Kerrigan as Callahan
- Howard Petrie as Brody
- Houseley Stevenson as Old Man
- Lewis Martin as Sergeant
- John War Eagle as Indian Chief
- Ray Teal as Ruger
- Clancy Cooper as Sloan

== Production ==
The Wild North was known at one stage by the working titles, "Constable Pedley", "The Wild North Country" and "North Country". The film was based on the true story of Mountie Constable Arthur Pedley, who in 1904 was assigned to find a lost missionary in northern Alberta. He managed to succeed despite great difficulty.

Location filming started in Idaho in March 1951 with Granger and Corey. Filming was then halted to enable Granger to make The Light Touch (1951). Filming was scheduled to resume in July in Chipewyan, Alberta, Canada, where the actual events in Pedley's story had taken place. Due to inclement weather in Canada, filming was completed in the United States.

The Wild North was shot in a new colour process. John Arnold, MGM's executive director of photography, and John Nicholaus, head of the studio's film laboratory, worked with Ansco for 10 years to develop the new process. It had several advantages, being able to be used in standard black and white cameras and "... processed in the studio laboratory with essentially the same facility as black and white film ... [making] possible many time-saving steps in the handling, development and screening of daily rushes. An additional advantage noted in American Cinematographer was that the film was particularly good for 'day-for-night' shooting, which was used significantly in 'The Wild North'."

== Reception ==
=== Critical ===
The Wild North was critically reviewed by Bosley Crowther for The New York Times. He said, "... the picture is not of a consistent piece, either in its narration nor in its photography. There are high points and dismally low points in its generally pulp-fiction tale of how an amiable French Canadian woodsman brings in a Mountie who was sent to bring him in. The high points are reached in a sequence showing a battle of the two men with wolves and in another recording their transit of a boiling rapids in a bobbing canoe. The low points are touched when they are struggling through the obvious studio snow."

The movie was criticized by Canadian historian Pierre Berton as being an unjust and untrue telling of the story of Constable Pedley in his 1975 book about how Hollywood distorted the global image of Canada, Hollywood's Canada. Berton talked about how the real story of Pedley was distorted and changed to make Pedley out to be the antagonist when the actual account of what happened had none; Pedley had to bring a missionary who'd become mentally ill to Fort Saskatchewan, Alberta from Fort Chipewyan, a 21-day journey of 380 miles (612 kilometers), for medical treatment. The journey was long and arduous due to the conditions ( travelling for five days in slush and water plus severe snowstorms and temperatures which dropped fifty degrees below zero) and the man's insanity made it hard for Pedley even more, as he had to keep him from escaping once and had to build big fires to keep wolves at bay, and also had to tie him down to force feed him and keep him from escaping again. The whole mission took its toll on Pedley; after he got the man to Fort Saskatchewan and then proceeded back to Fort Chipewyan, he was only able to reach Lac La Biche, where he also broke down mentally and had to be confined to a mental hospital for six months. When he recovered, he was given three months' leave and then went back on duty. Pedley was paid $1,000 for the permission to use his story, which was changed from what happened to make Pedley out to be the one who needed to be rescued by a French-Canadian man (Granger)-who the real man wasn't-played in a stereotypical way noted by Berton that had been the way French-Canadians were portrayed in Hollywood's movies about Canada since the early 1900's, part of a pattern noted by Berton about how Hollywood saw Canada in 525 movies dating from the silent era to the early '60's.

=== Box Office ===
The Wild North earned an estimated $2 million at the North American box office in 1952. MGM records puts this figure at $2,111,000 with earnings of $1,896,000 elsewhere, leading to a profit of $806,000. In France, the film recorded admissions of 1,746,799.
