= VistaVision =

Motion picture camera film format

Logotype of the VistaVision format

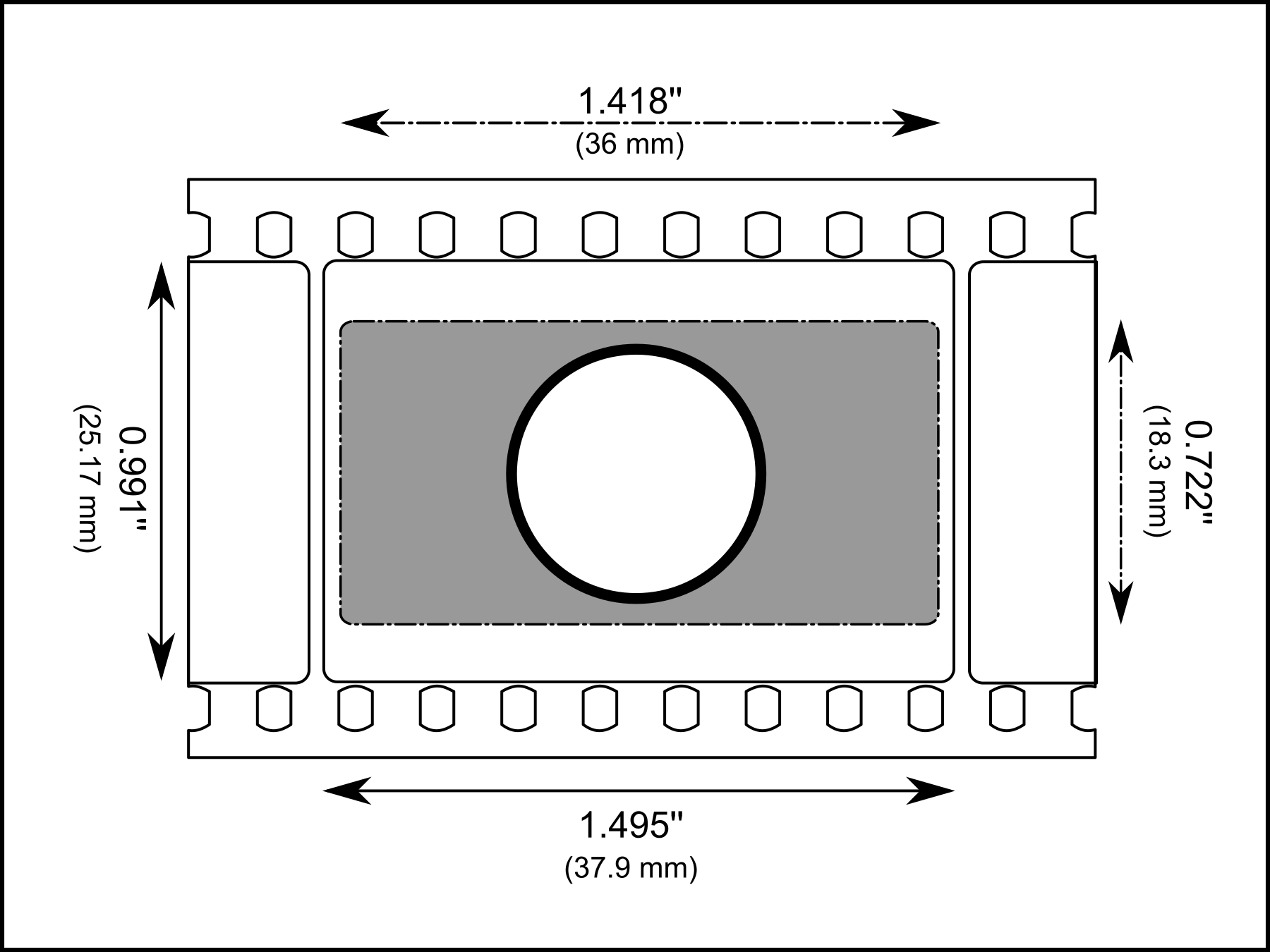
A VistaVision 35 mm film frame (the dotted area shows a 1.85:1 aspect ratio crop)

VistaVision is a cinematographic technique which uses a higher-resolution, widescreen variant of the 35 mm motion-picture film format. It was created and designed by engineers at Paramount Pictures in 1954.

Paramount did not use anamorphic processes such as CinemaScope but refined the quality of its flat widescreen system by orienting the 35 mm negative horizontally in the camera gate and shooting onto a larger area, which yielded a finer-grained projection print.

As finer-grained film stocks appeared on the market, VistaVision became obsolete. Paramount dropped the format after only seven years, although for another 40 years the format was used by some European and Asian producers for feature films and by American films such as the first three Star Wars films for high-resolution visual effects sequences. The format made a comeback in feature films in the 2020s after its use on The Brutalist in 2024, One Battle After Another and Bugonia in 2025, and Wuthering Heights and Digger in 2026.

In many ways, VistaVision was a testing ground for cinematography ideas that evolved into 70 mm IMAX and OMNIMAX film formats in the 1970s. Both IMAX and OMNIMAX are oriented sideways, as is VistaVision.

== History ==
As a response to an industry recession caused largely by the popularity of television, the Hollywood studios turned to large-format films in order to regain audience attendance. In 1952, the widescreen format Cinerama debuted in September, and consisted of three strips of 35 mm film projected side-by-side onto a giant, curved screen, augmented by seven channels of stereophonic sound. In 1953, Twentieth Century-Fox announced the introduction of a simpler version of Cinerama using anamorphic lenses instead of multiple film strips, a widescreen process later known as CinemaScope.

By January 1953, Paramount Pictures decided to convert Sangaree (1953) into a 3-D production, which had originally been filmed "flat" for the prior two weeks. When the film was screened for Paramount president Barney Balaban, he had a lengthy conversation with Spyros Skouras, president of Twentieth Century-Fox, in which Balaban stated he had preferred the CinemaScope process. By the next month, Paramount Pictures devised its own system to augment its 3-D process, known as Paravision. This process utilized a screen size that yielded an aspect ratio of five units wide by three units high. The first film released by Paramount to use the Paravision process was Red Garters (1954).

This "flat" widescreen process was adopted by other studios, and by the end of 1953, more than half of the theaters in the U.S. had installed widescreens. However, because a smaller portion of the image was used and magnification was increased, excessive grain and soft images plagued early widescreen presentations. Some studios sought to compensate for these effects by shooting color films with a full aperture gate (rather than the Academy aperture) and then reducing the image in Technicolor's optical printer. This process is a predecessor of today's Super 35 format, which also uses a 1.85:1 ratio but one-third more frame area than does a standard 1.85:1 matted into a 4:3 ratio.

The idea behind VistaVision originated with John R. Bishop, the head of Paramount's camera department. He had been impressed with the Cinerama process, although he took exception to the blow-up process. He told Popular Science Magazine: "The negative is the bad boy. We simply can't store enough detail in its small size. Sit close to the screen, and your eyes tire. Too fuzzy, too grainy." He became interested in projecting the widescreen image in sharp detail. He installed a Leica lens in a Mitchell Camera after remembering an abandoned two-frame color system developed by the William P. Stein Company that exposed both negatives to form a single projection image. Bishop turned the camera on its side and shot a film test which proved successful. In shooting in the VistaVision process, the film was run horizontally rather than vertically, and instead of exposing two simultaneous four-perforation frames, the entire eight perforations were used for one image. The negative frame area was approximated to be 1.472 x 0.997 inches.

During its technical development, Paramount's camera technicians dubbed this process the "Lazy 8" system, by which the term "lazy" stood for the horizontal film path, and "8" for the eight-sprocket image width. Paramount trade-named the process "VistaVision" early in 1954, and the first production to utilize the camera process was White Christmas (1954). The process afforded a wider aspect ratio of 1.5:1 versus the conventional 1.37:1 Academy ratio, and a much larger image area.

== Pre-release demonstration ==
"On Monday of this week [October 4, 1954] Paramount gave a press demonstration at its Hollywood studio of a new method of projecting VistaVision pictures," wrote trade publisher Pete Harrison, who told exhibitors what to expect from the new format. "According to a studio release, Paramount will make available to exhibitors three types of VistaVision release prints: the standard print suitable for playing in any theatre; the "squeeze" print for anamorphic projection; and the large-frame horizontal print suitable for theatres that will be fitted with extra large screens. Excerpts from several VistaVision features were shown at the demonstration, but the most impressive was a James A. FitzPatrick short subject, VistaVision Visits Norway. The photography was superb. It was not only sharp, but also had depth -- not the depth of third dimension, but noticeable depth just the same. And the color was exquisite. The footage was shown on a screen 60 feet high and 32 feet wide, and in an aspect ratio of 1.85 to 1."

In its lead-up to White Christmas, Paramount Pictures' publicity department stressed the CinemaScope process was "uncomfortably wide", in which their "VistaVision" process would emphasize that "height is as important as width." By then, several theaters had been equipped with horizontal screen projectors for VistaVision's eight-sprocket image frame. For theater exhibitors that were not equipped, an alternate 35 mm film print was used with a compatible sound system known as "Perspecta Stereo", encoded in the optical track. The VistaVision fanfare, heard in most of the films produced in this ratio, was composed by Nathan Van Cleave.

== Premiere ==
White Christmas held its West Coast premiere at the Warner Beverly Hills Theatre on October 27, 1954 (with the VistaVision travelogue VistaVision Visits Norway). The Los Angeles Times detailed the VistaVision process was "a simple innovation, but not easy to grasp" by which they noted the "enlargement and compression process gives the picture a depth of focus which enhances its clarity." Before its release, in March 1954, Paramount chief engineer Loren L. Ryder believed that VistaVision would become the forerunner of widescreen projection for the following reasons:

- VistaVision could be shown at widescreen aspect ratios between 1.66:1 and 2.00:1.
- VistaVision could be (and most often was) further printed down to standard vertical 35 mm reels, keeping its 1.66:1 widescreen aspect ratio, which meant that exhibitors did not need to purchase additional projection equipment, as was often required for CinemaScope.
- VistaVision did not force the elimination of seats in any theater (as did Cinerama, and CinemaScope at first).
- VistaVision allowed patrons to see more and, therefore, gain more enjoyment from a film.

Following the film's release, Paramount reiterated its policy to have their standard film prints "available to play in any theatre anywhere in the world with no requirement that the exhibitor alter [their] equipment in order to play a VistaVision picture." Subsequent Paramount films including Strategic Air Command (1955), To Catch a Thief (1955), The Man Who Knew Too Much (1956), The Ten Commandments (1956), Funny Face (1957), and Vertigo (1958) were filmed in VistaVision. Though it was not as prevalent as CinemaScope, rival studios adopted the VistaVision process, including MGM's High Society (1956), Warner Bros.' The Searchers (1956), and United Artists' The Vikings (1958).

By the late 1950s, VistaVision became obsolete with the industry preference for Panavision and more refinements in Eastmancolor film stock. Paramount produced their final Vistavision film, One-Eyed Jacks in 1961. By the 1960s, they adopted Technirama as its primary widescreen projection system.

Since the release of One-Eyed Jacks which began shooting in 1958 but was not released until 1961, the format would not be used as a primary imaging system for a feature film until 2024. However, VistaVision's high resolution made it attractive for some visual effects work within some later feature films.

== Technical specifications ==
The technical specifications for VistaVision are:

- Eight perforations per frame of 35mm film
- Horizontal pulldown from right to left, viewed from base side
- Camera aperture: 1.485 inches (37.72 mm) by 0.991 inches (25.17 mm)
- Spherical lenses (originally adapted and remounted Leica full-frame Rangefinder camera lenses)

See Technirama for usage with anamorphic lenses.

== Films shot in VistaVision ==
1954's White Christmas was the first Paramount film to utilize the VistaVision method, but perhaps the best-known film to be filmed completely in VistaVision format was Alfred Hitchcock's 1958 film Vertigo. The use of VistaVision faded by the beginning of the 1960s, with One-Eyed Jacks in 1961 being the final American film of the 20th Century to be shot entirely using the VistaVision process.

By the 21st century, however, the format saw a revival with The Brutalist in 2024. That same year, it was reported that Paul Thomas Anderson filmed his 2025 film One Battle After Another in VistaVision, as well as Yorgos Lanthimos's Bugonia (2025), Alejandro González Iñárritu's Digger (2026), Greta Gerwig's Narnia: The Magician's Nephew (2027) and M. Night Shyamalan's Remain (2027). Emerald Fennell's 2026 adaptation of Wuthering Heights was also filmed in the format as was the music videos for Sabrina Carpenter's "House Tour", Harry Styles's "Dance No More", and Ariana Grande's "Petal".

== Legacy ==
The camera numbered VistaVision #1 that was used on Cecil B. DeMille's The Ten Commandments and several Alfred Hitchcock films was offered at auction on September 30, 2015 by Profiles in History with an estimated value of US$30,000 to $50,000, with a winning bid of US$65,000. Also offered at the same auction was VistaVision High Speed #1 (VVHS1), which was used to film the parting of the Red Sea in The Ten Commandments and special effects for Star Wars (winning bid: US$60,000.)

In Lupin the 3rd: The Mystery of Mamo, the VistaVision process was used and modified known as "Anime Vision", which allowed for a brighter and sharper picture for projection in theaters compared to a TV production.

As digital cinema camera development shifted towards larger sensors in the mid to late 2010's, several camera models began to approach the size of the original Vistavision format. The RED Dragon (2015), Monstro (2017), and V-Raptor (2021) 8K camera sensors were branded as "VV" for Vistavision - although the Red sensors were 40.96 mm x 21.60 mm instead of 36 mm x 24 mm. Arri's Alexa LF (2018) and Alexa Mini LF (2019) both use a 36.70mm x 25.54mm sensor slightly larger than Vistavision, while the Sony Venice 1 (2017) and Venice 2 (2021) sensor is almost exactly 36 mm x 24 mm. The increased market share of larger sensors led to many older stills lenses being rehoused for cinema cameras, as these "full frame" lenses were designed for 8-perf 35mm stills cameras - essentially the same format as Vistavision.

The film Little Five, directed by Ian Samuels, about the first women's Little 500 bike race, will be shot using VistaVision and other 35mm cameras.

== See also ==
- Technirama
- List of film formats

== Bibliography ==
- "The Story of VistaVision" by Keith Wilson, Cinema Retro, Vol. 11, Issue 31, 2015 (on US newsstands Feb 2015), pages 40–41. Large format magazine article with nine photos, including technical.
