= Fol-de-Rol =

- TV Times Ad
- Starring: Ann Sothern; Mickey Rooney; Ricky Nelson; Cyd Charisse; Howard Cosell; Totie Fields; Yma Sumac
- Country of origin: United States

Production
- Producer: Sid and Marty Krofft
- Running time: 60 minutes

Original release
- Network: ABC
- Release: February 27, 1972

Fol-de-Rol is a prime-time family variety special in the USA that was set at a medieval fair, produced by Sid and Marty Krofft and based on their 1968 live puppet show. It was broadcast by ABC on February 27, 1972. It was directed by Tony Charmoli and scripted by David Robison, Les Pine, Jerry Mayer and Dennis Kleinhole.

== Plot ==
The special consists of a series of vignettes loosely tied together by the setting of a Renaissance fair. Howard Cosell narrates the story of Noah's Flood (Mickey Rooney); Ricky Nelson plays a singing minstrel performing the song "He Ain't Heavy, He's My Brother." Cyd Charisse performs a butterfly dance. Ann Sothern watches over proceedings as The Queen. Yma Sumac sings an unknown song. The show's ensemble performs "Joy to the World." An instrumental piece "Classical Gas" is played over the ensemble dancers.

== Sources ==
- Erickson, Hal (2007). Sid and Marty Krofft: A Critical Study of Saturday Morning Children's Television, 1969-1993. McFarland. ISBN 9780786430932.
