= John Brascia =

American actor and dancer

- Born: May 11, 1932; Fresno, California, U.S.
- Died: February 19, 2013 (aged 80); Santa Monica, California, U.S.
- Years active: 1950-1980
- Spouse(s): Tybee Arfa (divorced); Sondra Scott (m. December 1970, divorced); Jordan Michaels (m. 1986)
- Children: 2
- Family: Cade McNown (son-in-law)

John F. Brascia (May 11, 1932 – February 19, 2013) was an American actor and dancer, famous for his dancing partnerships on film with Vera-Ellen in White Christmas (1954) and with Cyd Charisse and Liliane Montevecchi in Meet Me in Las Vegas (1956).

== Early life ==
John Frank Brascia was born on May 11, 1932, in Fresno, California, to Italian immigrants Gaetano Brascia and Caterina Napolitano. The Brascia clan including his Uncle Mike and Aunt Concetta Brascia, moved from Brooklyn, New York, before John Frank was born. He had two siblings, Cecilia and Vincent.

Brascia was a high-school basketball player beginning in his sophomore year at Colton High School as co-captain. At 5 ft 11 in (1.80 m) he took the position of guard in his junior year; he was a starter for the Colton Yellowjackets. He played for Colton on the football squad as the starting quarterback in his junior and senior years.

== Career ==
=== Film ===
Brascia was a featured dancer with Vera-Ellen in White Christmas (1954) and with Cyd Charisse and Liliane Montevecchi in Meet Me in Las Vegas (1956). With dancer and wife, Tybee Arfa (1932–1982), he formed the dance team Brascia and Tybee, which, beginning in 1957, began appearing as the opening act for artists like Frank Sinatra, Lena Horne, Tony Martin and George Burns, among others. Married in 1958, the duo appeared frequently on television's The Ed Sullivan Show (1958–66) and on The Hollywood Palace (1967).

Brascia began acting in non-dancing film roles beginning in 1967, beginning with two Matt Helm movies featuring Dean Martin, and culminating in The Baltimore Bullet (1980), which he produced and was credited with the film's story and screenplay.

=== Broadway ===
Brascia made his Broadway debut on February 11, 1953, in the musical version of the film "Nothing Sacred," titled Hazel Flagg, which featured a score by Jule Styne and Bob Hilliard. The production was supervised and choreographed by Robert Alton (who choreographed the film White Christmas, featuring Brascia, a year later). Brascia won a Donaldson Award for his performance in the musical.

=== Nightclubs ===
John Brascia was a featured dancer in The Magic Carpet Revue, New York - Paris - Paradise, which opened at the Dunes Hotel in Las Vegas on May 23, 1955, and starred Vera-Ellen with a cast of 60.

"... the entire evening was built around Vera-Ellen, who tapped and did ballet and sang, happily undubbed, and wore gorgeous costumes by Hollywood's famed designer Howard Shoup. ... Her routines were based on those developed for her by Robert Alton. She did partnered dances with friend John Brascia, who was also given solo dancing opportunities."

== Reviews ==
Meet Me in Las Vegas " ... the best thing, by far, is the finale — a gaudy, satiric ballet, done to the old "Frankie and Johnny" ballad, as arranged by Johnny Green. Miss Charisse is accompanied in this one by Liliane Montevecchi as "the other dame" and John Brascia as the luckless Johnny, and the ballad, with modern bebop lyrics, by Sammy Cahn, is sung by the off-screen voice of Sammy Davis Jr. It's crazy, man! And cool!" -- Bosley Crowther, New York Times

== Personal life ==
Brascia was married three times. He married his dance partner, Tybee Arfa, in 1958.

His second marriage was to actress and model Sondra Scott, with whom he had a daughter. Tony Bennett served as his best man in 1970. That marriage also ended in divorce.

He married actress and model Jordan Michaels in 1986. The couple had a daughter.

== Death ==
Brascia died in 2013, aged 80, and was survived by Jordan Michaels Brascia, his two daughters, and extended family. His son-in-law (by his older daughter) was football player Cade McNown.

== Filmography ==
Year	Title	Role	Notes
1950	Summer Stock	Dancer	Uncredited
1953	Call Me Madam	Dancer in 'The Ocarina' Number	Uncredited
1953	Torch Song	Dancer	Uncredited
1954	White Christmas	John	
1956	Meet Me in Las Vegas	Specialty Dancer	
1967	The Ambushers	Rocco	
1969	The Wrecking Crew	Karl	
1973	Walking Tall	Prentiss Parley	
1973	Executive Action	Rifleman - Team B	
1974	Pray for the Wildcats	Captain Guiterrez	ABC Movie of the Week
1975	S.W.A.T.	Tom	TV series, 2 episodes
1976	Joe and Sons	Piggy	TV series, 1 episode
1980	The Baltimore Bullet	Poker Player, New Orleans	(final film role)
