= Assassination in Rome =

1965 Italian film

- Italian theatrical release poster
- Italian: Il segreto del vestito rosso
- Directed by: Silvio Amadio
- Written by: Silvio Amadio; Giovanni Simonelli
- Produced by: Aldo Pomilia
- Starring: Hugh O'Brian; Cyd Charisse; Eleonora Rossi Drago; Alberto Closas; Memmo Carotenuto; Franco Giacobini; Mario Feliciani
- Cinematography: Mario Pacheco
- Edited by: Marcello Malvestito
- Music by: Armando Trovajoli
- Production companies: Apo Film; Midega Film; Dicifrance
- Distributed by: Italcid (Italy); CEA Distribución (Spain)
- Release dates: 11 May 1965 (Barcelona); 7 June 1965 (Spain)
- Running time: 104 minutes
- Countries: Italy; France; Spain
- Languages: Italian; English

Assassination in Rome (Italian: Il segreto del vestito rosso, lit. 'The Secret of the Red Dress'; Spanish: El secreto de Bill North, lit. 'The Secret of Bill North') is a 1965 giallo film co-written and directed by Silvio Amadio.

== Cast ==
- Hugh O'Brian as Dick Sherman
- Cyd Charisse as Shelley North
- Eleonora Rossi Drago as Erika Tiller
- Alberto Closas as Inspector Baudi
- Memmo Carotenuto as Dino
- Alberto Dalbés as Bill North
- Juliette Mayniel as Lorena Borelli
- Franco Giacobini as Choco
- Manuel Alexandre as Baudi's assistant
- Antonio Casas
- Carlos Casaravilla as Regi Bank
- Gina Rovere as Dino and Choco's neighbour
- Philippe Lemaire as Mr. Borelli
- Mario Feliciani as Charles Mallicia
- José María Seoane

== Production ==
The film was originally meant to star John Gavin, but he pulled out at the last minute and was replaced by Hugh O'Brian.
