= Clifford Schoeffler =

United States Air Force general

Brig. Gen. Clifford Schoeffler
- Born: March 8, 1924; Lafayette, Louisiana
- Died: August 22, 2005 (aged 81)
- Military career
- Allegiance: United States of America
- Branch: United States Air Force
- Service years: 1942–1975
- Rank: Brigadier General
- Unit: 7th Bombardment Wing
- Conflicts: World War II; Vietnam War
- Awards: Legion of Merit; Distinguished Flying Cross; Bronze Star; Air Medal (7); Joint Service Commendation Medal; Air Force Commendation Medal(3)

Brigadier General Clifford Schoeffler (March 8, 1924 – August 22, 2005) was director of operations and training in the Office of the Deputy Chief of Staff, Operations, Headquarters Strategic Air Command, Offutt Air Force Base, Nebraska. He was a command pilot with more than 10,000 flying hours accumulated during his career.

== Early life ==
Schoeffler was born in Lafayette, Louisiana, where he graduated from Lafayette High School in 1940 and attended the University of Louisiana at Lafayette, then named the Southwestern Louisiana Institute. In 1942 he enlisted in the United States Army Air Corps Reserve and began pilot training as an aviation cadet at Kelly Field, Texas. He received his pilot wings and commission as a second lieutenant in 1943.

== Military career ==
=== Early career ===
After serving in 1944 as a B-24 pilot in which he completed 30 missions for the Eighth Air Force in England, he returned to the United States. He became an instructor pilot at Bryan Army Air Base, Texas, and later at Barksdale Air Force Base, Louisiana.

=== Carswell Air Force Base ===
From 1948 to 1960, Schoeffler was stationed at Carswell Air Force Base, Texas. During the return of the 7th Bomb Wing from an Arctic bombing exercise then-Lt Col Schoeffler was involved in a crash at Canadian Forces Base Goose Bay on 12 February 1953 that claimed two lives. Flying through adverse weather Schoeffler was receiving directions for an instrument landing by a ground control operator who was actually monitoring another nearby B-36. Colonel Chadwell, the Wing Commander, was on board at the time. When the plane hit the ground the aft section broke off and the open end acted like a giant scoop packing in the snow. This incident would provide the basis for the 1955 film Strategic Air Command starring James Stewart which Schoeffler served as a consultant. He graduated from the Air Tactical School at Tyndall Air Force Base, Florida. While at Carswell he also flew B-29 Superfortress and B-52 Stratofortress aircraft, and accumulated more than 5,000 hours flying the B-36. He served consecutively as a crewmember, flight standardization chief, squadron commander, and deputy commander for operations of the 7th Bombardment Wing.

=== 1961-1975 ===
Schoeffler graduated from the Air War College at Maxwell Air Force Base, Alabama, in 1961. He next was assigned to the 379th Bombardment Wing, equipped with B-52H aircraft, at Wurtsmith Air Force Base, Michigan, where he served as squadron commander, deputy commander for operations, and as a 40th Air Division operations staff officer. He returned to Barksdale Air Force Base in 1965, and was assigned as operations chief in the office of the inspector general, Second Air Force, and a year later became deputy commander for operations of the 2nd Bombardment Wing.

He traveled to the Republic of Vietnam in 1967 as deputy chief of the Strategic Air Command advanced echelon at Tan Son Nhut Air Base. He flew combat missions in B-52 Stratofortress, KC-135, and UH-1 Iroquois aircraft. In 1968 he was transferred to Strategic Air Command headquarters as chief of the Contingency Division in the office of the deputy chief of staff, operations. In 1972 he was assigned to the Joint Chiefs of Staff in Washington, D.C., as chief of the Strategic Operations Division within the Directorate of Operations. He was promoted to the rank of brigadier general on April 2, 1973. He returned to SAC headquarters in 1974 to assume duties as director of operations and training. He retired in 1975.

== Military decorations and awards ==
- Legion of Merit
- Distinguished Flying Cross
- Bronze Star
- Air Medal with six oak leaf clusters
- Joint Service Commendation Medal
- Air Force Commendation Medal with two oak leaf clusters
- Presidential Unit Citation
- Air Force Outstanding Unit Award
