= Blue Mercedes =

British pop music duo

Blue Mercedes were a pop music duo from London, England, composed of David Titlow (born 28 November 1965) and Duncan Millar (26 May 1963 – May 2022).

== History ==
Their only album, Rich and Famous, was produced by Phil Harding and Ian Curnow for PWL, with songs written by Titlow and Millar. "It was dance pop, out and out; it needed to work on the dance floor," recalled Harding of actioning the brief given to him by the band.

"I Want to Be Your Property," released in the UK in October 1987, reached #23 in the UK national chart. In the US, it was a minor Billboard Hot 100 hit, peaking at #66 in 1988, but their real success Stateside occurred on the Hot Dance Club Play chart, where it spent four weeks at #1.

"Love Is the Gun," released in the UK in June 1988, peaked at #46 in the UK national chart and #5 on the US Hot Dance Club Play chart. It was Smash Hits' "Single of the Fortnight" in June 1988.

"See Want Must Have" was released in the UK in February 1988, and reached #18 in the Hot Dance Club Play chart in the US.

The following tracks were also released as singles: "Treehouse" (November 1988); "Heaven on Earth" (March 1989); "Run for Your Love" (May 1989); and "Crunchy Love Affaire" (July 1989). (Chart information has not been found for these yet.)

After releasing the single "That Beauty Is You," they evolved into the indie dance band Nixon, and released the song "Sweet Temptation." Later, they released a number of dance tracks under the name Monica De Luxe, which entered UK Dance Charts.

Titlow then went on to form the indie rock band Heave, who released one album titled "Scaramanga," released on Radar Records in the early 1990s.

Titlow is now a fashion and music photographer.

Millar went on to produce further dance tracks including, as Exoterix, the first track released by EMI dance label Positiva Records in 1993. Later, he released an acid jazz instrumental album under the name A One, on Indochina Records (subsidiary label of China Records), and two smooth jazz albums on Instinct Records, achieving a UK MOBO nomination as Best UK Jazz Act for the first of these in 1999. He died in May 2022.

== Discography ==
=== Singles ===
Year	Single	Chart	Position
January 1988	"I Want To Be Your Property"	US Dance Chart	1
October 1987	"I Want to Be Your Property"	UK Singles Chart	23
April 1988	"See Want Must Have"	US Dance Chart	18
February 1988	"See Want Must Have"	UK Singles Chart	57
August 1988	"Love is The Gun"	US Dance Chart	5
July 1988	"Love is The Gun"	UK Singles Chart	46
November 1988	"Treehouse"	UK Singles Chart	-
March 1989	"Heaven On Earth"	UK Singles Chart	-
May 1989	"Run For Your Love"	UK Singles Chart	-
July 1989	"Crunchy Love Affaire"	UK Singles Chart	-
October 1989	"That Beauty is You"	UK Singles Chart	-
October 1990	"Sweet Temptation"*	UK Singles Chart	-

- as Nixon [MCA Records - NXN 1]

=== Albums ===
Year	Album	Chart	Position
1988	Rich and Famous	New Zealand Albums Chart	25
1988	Rich and Famous	US Albums Chart	165
1988	Rich and Famous	UK Albums Chart	-

== See also ==
- List of Number 1 Dance Hits (United States)
- List of artists who reached number one on the US Dance chart
- One-hit wonders in the UK
