= Meet Me in Las Vegas =

1956 US musical comedy film by Roy Rowland

- Theatrical release poster
- Directed by: Roy Rowland
- Written by: Isobel Lennart
- Produced by: Joe Pasternak
- Starring: Dan Dailey; Cyd Charisse
- Cinematography: Robert J. Bronner
- Edited by: Albert Akst
- Music by: George Stoll
- Production company: Metro-Goldwyn-Mayer
- Distributed by: Metro-Goldwyn-Mayer
- Release date: March 9, 1956
- Running time: 112 minutes
- Country: United States
- Language: English
- Budget: $2,495,000
- Box office: $3,714,000

Meet Me in Las Vegas is a 1956 American musical comedy film directed by Roy Rowland, filmed in Eastman Color and CinemaScope, and starring Dan Dailey and Cyd Charisse. The film was tailored for the talents of Charisse, showcasing her skills with modern and classical ballet.

It was produced by Joe Pasternak for Metro-Goldwyn-Mayer. The original story and screenplay is by Isobel Lennart, cinematography by Robert Bronner, music direction by George Stoll of Skip Martin's orchestrations, with choreography by Hermes Pan and Eugene Loring. It was largely shot on location in Las Vegas and various popular celebrities made cameo appearances.

== Plot ==
High roller rancher Chuck Rodwell arrives at the Sands Hotel for his annual visit to the gambling tables. He is greeted warmly by the staff, who all like him and want him to avoid losing everything, as he has done on his prior trips. He has a superstition: he thinks holding hands with any unsuspecting woman walking by brings him luck.

Meanwhile, Sands manager Tom Culdane is having trouble with the headliner of his show, ballerina Maria Corvier, who is so insulted that people will be dining during her performance that she threatens to quit. She stomps out into the casino, where Chuck grabs her hand, much to her annoyance. It works; the roulette ball falls on his number. When she returns the tip he sends her, he asks why she is so angry. She apologizes and they shake hands, and he immediately wins on the next spin of a slot machine. Down to his last $20 on his first day, he asks Maria to hold his hand. She is skeptical, but two straight wins on the slot machine in her suite make her reconsider. As an experiment, they try various combinations at the roulette wheel—him by himself, him holding another woman's hand, her by herself and her holding another man's hand—but only Chuck and Maria together wins. On the way to dinner, Chuck puts a coin in a slot machine for a random stranger; (Frank Sinatra), who wins. They listen to Lena Horne sings "If You Can Dream" after dinner.

As she is employed (for two weeks) at the Sands, they gamble at other casinos, winning everywhere they go. Finally, one desperate casino manager pressures Kelly Donovan, Chuck's old singer girlfriend, to get him to take a break. Maria becomes jealous, though Chuck remains oblivious to her infatuation with him. She gets drunk and joins showgirls performing onstage. Later, Lotzi, Chuck's blackjack dealer friend, asks to hold Chuck's winnings. When Chuck asks for the money back the next day, Lotzi tells him he sent it all to Chuck's mother. He does give Chuck a single bill.

Kelly gives up on him and lets him know Maria is attracted to him. He takes Maria to his ranch to meet his mother. While there, Chuck's dry oil well strikes a gusher. Chuck proposes, and Maria accepts.

However, their lucky streak ends when they return to the roulette table. With the magic suddenly gone, they reconsider, seeing as they are two very different people with little in common, and decide to break up, much to the distress of her friend and mentor Sari Hatvany and the concealed delight of her agent Pierre. However, Chuck reconsiders and reconciles with Maria; they will spend half a year on his ranch, half a year in her world, with Chuck promising to give up gambling.

== Cast ==
- Dan Dailey as Chuck Rodwell
- Cyd Charisse as Maria Corvier
- Agnes Moorehead as Miss Hattie
- Lili Darvas as Sari Hatvany
- Jim Backus as Tom Culdane
- Oskar Karlweis as Lotzi
- Liliane Montevecchi as Lilli
- Cara Williams as Kelly Donavan
- George Chakiris (credited as George Kerris) as young groom
- Betty Lynn as young bride
- Henry, Jack and Sid Slate as the Slate Brothers
- Pete Rugolo as conductor
- John Brascia as specialty dancer
- John Harding as worried boss
- Benny Rubin as croupier
- Jack Daly as meek husband
- Henny Backus as bossy wife
- Jerry Colonna as himself
- Paul Henreid as Pierre
- Lena Horne as herself
- Frankie Laine as himself
- Mitsuko Sawamura as herself
- The Four Aces as themselves

Uncredited cameos include Frank Sinatra, Debbie Reynolds, Vic Damone, Pier Angeli, Peter Lorre, and Tony Martin (who was married to Charisse). Jazzman Pete Rugolo plays the house band's pianist-conductor.

== Music ==
The original songs were composed by Nicholas Brodszky and Sammy Cahn.

For the closing production ballet, Sammy Davis Jr. narrated and sang offscreen an updated "Frankie and Johnny", danced principally by Charisse, Montevecchi, and Brascia, with special lyrics by Sammy Cahn and arranged by Johnny Green.

== Reception ==
According to MGM records, the $2.5M film earned $2,217,000 in the U.S. and Canada and $1,497,000 in other markets, resulting in a profit of $496,000.

Critic Bosley Crowther wrote "... the best thing, by far, is the finale — a gaudy, satiric ballet, done to the old "Frankie and Johnny" ballad, as arranged by Johnny Green. Miss Charisse is accompanied in this one by Liliane Montevecchi as 'the other dame' and John Brascia as the luckless Johnny, and the ballad, with modern Bebop lyrics, by Sammy Cahn, is sung by the off-screen voice of Sammy Davis Jr. It's crazy, man! And cool!"

Georgie Stoll and Johnny Green were nominated for the Academy Award for Best Original Score, Scoring for a Musical Picture.

== Home media ==
The film was released on DVD from Warner Brothers Archive Collection on July 8, 2011.

== See also ==
- List of American films of 1956
- List of films set in Las Vegas
