= Duncan Millar (musician) =

British composer and songwriter (died 2022)

Duncan Millar (26 May 1963 – May 2022) was an English pianist, keyboardist, songwriter and record producer from London, England. He was part of the UK pop music duo Blue Mercedes in the late 1980s, whose most successful song was "I Want to Be Your Property". In 1988, it was a #1 hit for four weeks in the U.S. on the Billboard Hot Dance Club Play chart.

After this, Millar wrote and produced a number of tracks released on C.T. Records, including several in an Italo house style, under the name Monica de Luxe, and in 1992 the first track released by Tania Evans, subsequently of Culture Beat. He was then the first signing to EMI dance label Positiva Records in 1993, releasing a trance-style track called "Void" under the name Exoterix.

In 1998, after releasing an instrumental acid jazz album on Indochina Records (a subsidiary label of China Records) under the name A-One, Millar went on to release two smooth jazz albums on Instinct Records, N.Y.C. (Dream Your Dream and Good to Go). He achieved a UK MOBO nomination as Best Jazz Act for the first of these in 1999.

In 2013, Millar released a further smooth jazz album, Fresh Air, on his own label, Warmday Records.

In May 2022, his former manager Simon Napier-Bell announced that Millar had died from pneumonia.
