= Orson Welles theatre credits =

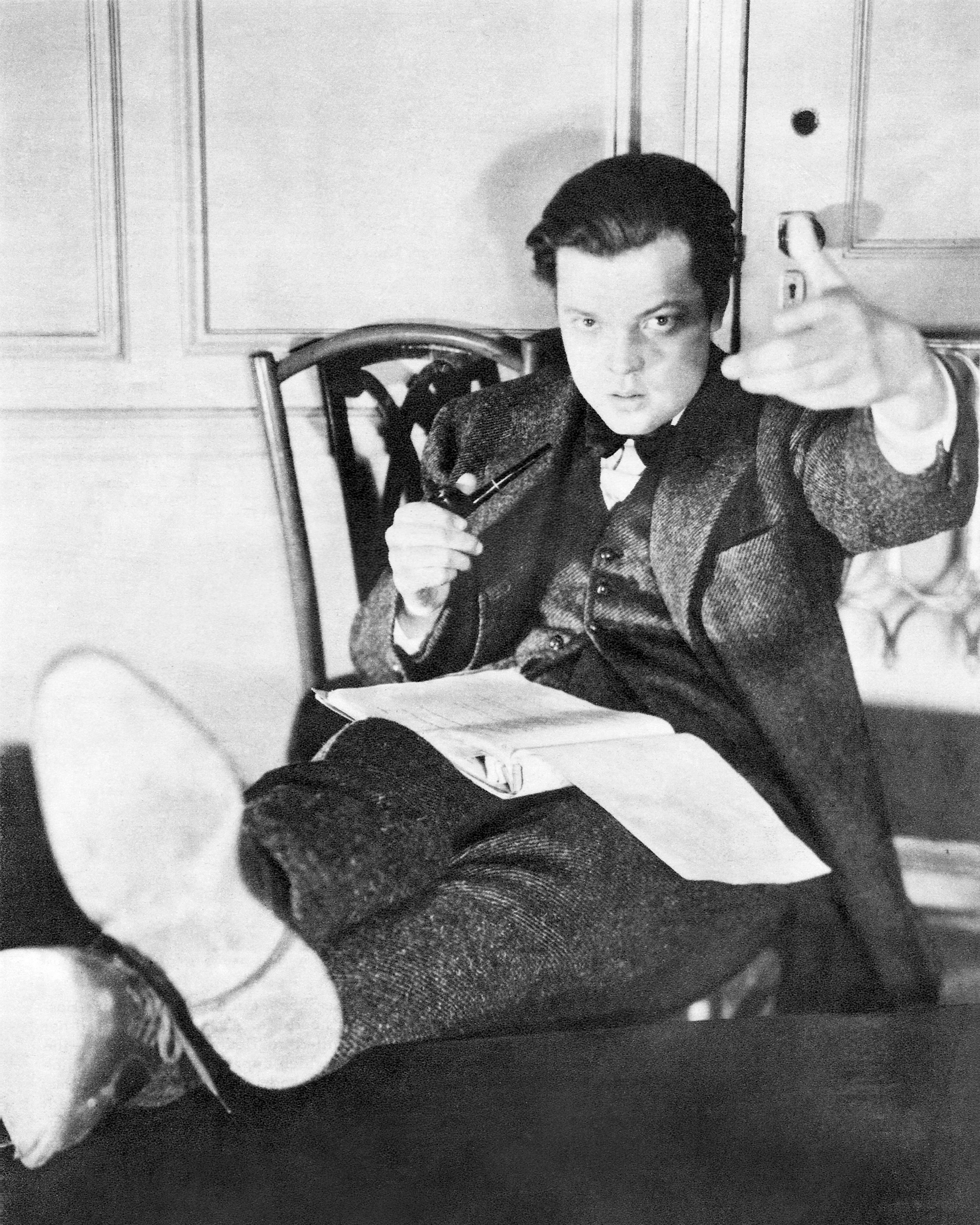
Orson Welles at the Mercury Theatre (1938)

This is a comprehensive listing of the theatre work of Orson Welles. In 1972 he was in the first set of members elected to the American Theater Hall of Fame. (Note: The others in the inaugural group of members in the Theater Hall of Fame were Walter Huston, Rudolf Friml, Lee and J. J. Shubert, Norman Bel Geddes, Jeanne Eagels, Ferenc Molnár, P. G. Wodehouse, Clyde Fitch, Lillian Russell, Arthur Hopkins, Marie Dressler, George S. Kaufman, Brooks Atkinson, George Abbott, Thornton Wilder, Ethel Merman, Bert Lahr, Moss Hart, Robert E. Sherwood, Maxwell Anderson and Clifford Odets.)

There isn't one person, I suppose, in a million, who knows that I was ever in the theatre.

— Orson Welles to friend and mentor Roger Hill, July 21, 1983

== 1918 ==
Date	Title	Author	Role	Company	Theatre	Director	Notes	References
July 10	Madame Butterfly	Luigi Illica and Giuseppe Giacosa, libretto Giacomo Puccini, score	Trouble	Chicago Opera	Ravinia Opera House	Cleofonte Campanini	(Note: Visiting soprano Claudia Muzio asked Beatrice Welles if three-year-old Orson could play the part of her illegitimate son, and Beatrice agreed. "The greatest soprano I ever heard was Claudia Muzio," said Welles. "I love the opera; it's my favorite form of theatre and always has been." Welles played child roles in the Chicago Opera Company until he became so heavy that singers complained about lifting him.)	
1918	Samson and Delilah	Ferdinand Lemaire, libretto Camille Saint-Saëns, score	walk-on	Chicago Opera	Ravinia Opera House	Cleofonte Campanini	(Note: Frank Brady: "His opera career ended when tenor Giovanni Martinelli indignantly refused to hoist him in a performance of Samson and Delilah.")	

== 1925 ==
Date	Title	Author	Role	Company	Theatre	Director	Notes	References
1925	Dr. Jekyll and Mr. Hyde	Robert Louis Stevenson, novella); Orson Welles, adaptation	Dr. Henry Jekyll/Edward Hyde	Camp Indianola	Governor Nelson State Park	Orson Welles	(Note: Lowell Frautschi, Welles's camp counselor, described this as "a one-man show in which Orson acted out Dr. Jekyll and Mr. Hyde, making the transformation from one character to the other, altering his facial expressions, voice, and movements in a truly amazing way. I told Mr. [Frederick G.] Mueller about it and suggested we save it for the last night of camp when a large number of parents would be present for a sort of commencement exercise to mark the close of the camp season. Young Orson played to a packed hall and was a stunning success.")	
1925	A Christmas Carol	Charles Dickens, novella Orson Welles, adaptation	Scrooge	Camp Indianola	Washington School, Madison, Wisconsin	Orson Welles		

== 1926 ==
Date	Title	Author	Role	Company	Theatre	Director	Notes	References
1926	Nativity play		Mary	Todd Seminary for Boys		Roger Hill	(Note: Welles entered the Todd Seminary for Boys September 15, 1926.)	
1926	The Servant in the House	Charles Rann Kennedy	Jesus	Todd Seminary for Boys		Roger Hill		
1926	Dust of the Road		Judas Iscariot	Todd Seminary for Boys		Roger Hill		

== 1927 ==
Date	Title	Author	Role	Company	Theatre	Director	Notes	References
May 27	It Won't Be Long Now	Roger Hill, libretto Carl Hendrickson, music	Jim Bailey	Todd Troupers	Durand Art Institute	Roger Hill	(Note: In spring 1927 Welles became a member of the Todd Troupers, a touring company that performed at regional schools, in suburban Chicago movie houses and at the Goodman Theatre. This touring performance of Todd's 1927 musical comedy was one of two in which Welles appeared. Welles was director of productions at the school for three years, producing eight to ten plays annually. These included Molière's The Physician in Spite of Himself, Dr. Faustus, "and an innovative Everyman staged with ladders and platforms" (Frank Brady).)	

== 1928 ==
Date	Title	Author	Role	Company	Theatre	Director	Notes	References
May 5	Finesse the Queen	Roger Hill, libretto Carl Hendrickson, music	William J. Spurns	Todd Seminary for Boys	Lindo Theatre, Freeport, Illinois	Roger Hill	(Note: In this touring performance of Todd's 1928 musical comedy, Welles appeared as a detective modeled after William J. Burns. Welles joined the ensemble in the finale, and he was featured in the number, "Everyone Loves a Fellow Who Is Smiling". Joseph McBride wrote that "when Welles felt in a particularly festive mood, or wanted to cheer up his sluggish actors, he would burst into a favorite song. It came from Finesse the Queen … Hearing him warble the tune in a tone of innocent sincerity took the listener back to Welles's semi-mythological youth: Everyone loves the follow who is smiling, He brightens the day and lightens the way for you — He's always making other people happy Looking rosy when you're feeling awful blue.")	

== 1929 ==
Date	Title	Author	Role	Company	Theatre	Director	Notes	References
1929	Julius Caesar	William Shakespeare, play Orson Welles, adaptation	Mark Antony; Cassius	Todd Troupers	Todd Seminary for Boys	Orson Welles	(Note: The New Yorker: "This was the Todd School's entry in the annual Drama League contest for high schools and little-theatre groups around Chicago. It didn't get the prize; the judges explained that, meritorious as the production was, the two lads who played Cassius and Mark Antony were both too mature to be bona-fide students. This was a severe disappointment to Welles, who had cast himself in these two leading roles to make sure that they were played exactly right.")	

== 1930 ==
Date	Title	Author	Role	Company	Theatre	Director	Notes	References
1930	Androcles and the Lion	George Bernard Shaw, play Orson Welles, adaptation	Ferovious	Todd Troupers	Todd Seminary for Boys	Orson Welles	(Note: Cast: Edgerton Paul (Androcles), Robert Crane (The Emperor), Hascy Tarbox (Metellus), others)	

== 1931 ==
Date	Title	Author	Role	Company	Theatre	Director	Notes	References
1931	Winter of Our Discontent	William Shakespeare, plays Orson Welles, adaptation	Richard III	Todd Troupers	Todd School for Boys	Orson Welles	(Note: Roger Hill: "He produced student plays in our own theatre nearly every weekend. And his senior project, Five Kings, played to the public as well as a Todd commencement audience.") (Note: Richard France: "In 1930, a year before his graduation, Welles created an appropriately titled version of two of the chronicle plays for an unofficial weekly publication. This was done expeditiously with crayon markings in a handy edition of The Complete Works of William Shakespeare. … Winter of Our Discontent is not merely an important artifact; it is the paradigm for all of his future adaptations of Shakespeare, whether for radio, film, or the stage. His editing showed an almost preternatural familiarity and sureness in reshaping Shakespeare into productions which for all intents and purposes were entirely his own.") (Note: The New Yorker: "His last big job before he graduated from Todd was a mélange of Shakespeare's historical plays—edited and directed by Orson Welles, starring Orson Welles. This was the germ of the Five Kings chronicle play to be presented by the Mercury this autumn to the Theatre Guild subscribers.")	
October 13–31	Jew Süss	Lion Feuchtwanger, novel Ashley Dukes, adaptation	Duke Karl Alexander of Württemberg	Dublin Gate Theatre Company	Gate Theatre, Dublin	Hilton Edwards	(Note: Welles's professional stage debut) (Note: Exaggerating his age and stage experience to the Gate Theatre's managers, Hilton Edwards and Micheál Mac Liammóir, Welles secured membership in the company at age 16, and soon replaced the actor playing this leading role.) (Note: The New York Times: "The Gate Theatre, for the first time since it took up quarters in its present home, is turning people away from its performances of Jew Süss … magnificently produced by Hilton Edwards, who also plays the title role. His is a most difficult part because for more than half the play it is second to that of the Duke Karl Alexander, and when Jew Süss's great moment comes it is too late as the play belongs to the Duke. This is particularly true in the case of the Gate production, in which the Duke is played by a young American actor, 18 years old, whose performance is amazingly fine. … Dublin is eager to see him in other roles.") (Note: Cast: Coralie Carmichael (Marie Auguste, the Duchess), Edward Levy (General Remchingen), William Sherwood (Councillor Weissensee), Meriel Moore (Magdalen), Hilton Edwards (Josef Süss Oppenheimer), Betty Chancellor (Naomi), Joseph Levison (Leader of Jewish Delegation), others)	
November 3–14	The Dead Ride Fast	David Sears	Ralph Bentley	Dublin Gate Theatre Company	Gate Theatre, Dublin	Hilton Edwards	(Note: The New York Times reviewed the premiere of "a weird drama which grips from the very start and at times develops situations which are well nigh terrifying in their tensions and power … I have never seen on any stage a more true-to-life portrait than that of the wealthy self-made American millionaire who, away from his field of activity, gives himself up with complete abandon to the enjoyment of the hour. Played by Orson Wells [sic], the young American actor, Ralph Bentley came to life in most convincing fashion.")	
November 20– December 5	The Archdupe	Percy Robinson	Marshal François Bazaine; Mexican Colonel	Dublin Gate Theatre Company	Gate Theatre, Dublin	Hilton Edwards	(Note: Reviewing this premiere of a new play about ill-fated Emperor Maximilian I of Mexico, The New York Times wrote that "Orson Welles, the young American actor, scored heavily as General Bazaine in the earlier scenes and, again, as the Republican Mexican Colonel in charge of the final arrangements.")	
December 6	The Circle	W. Somerset Maugham	Lord Porteous		Abbey Theatre, Dublin		(Note: Welles's only performance at the Abbey Theatre, in an independent production on its stage presented during the Abbey company's U.S. tour)	
December 26– January 9, 1932	Mogu of the Desert	Padraic Colum	Chosroes, King of Persia	Dublin Gate Theatre Company	Gate Theatre, Dublin	Hilton Edwards	(Note: The New York Times called this premiere "pure Arabian Nights entertainment and it is extremely appropriate to the holiday season. The story is that of a beggar who, with his daughter and a tame mouse, strays in from the desert and joins the Persian camp. The daughter marries the king while Mogu is raised to exalted rank. Years pass, power wearies and the wanderer, his daughter and second wife both dead, returns alone to the desert. … A series of beautifully colorful stage pictures.") (Note: Cast: Hilton Edwards (Mogu), Betty Chancellor, others)	
December 27	Alice in Wonderland USA	Lewis Carroll, novel William Sherwood, adaptation		Peacock Players	Peacock Theatre, Dublin		(Note: Twenty-two settings designed by Orson Welles) (Note: "I am quite rushed these days [just before Christmas, 1931] as I am designing and superintending the construction and painting of scenery—all of the scenery—in the Peacock, an art-theaterish stock company quite distinct from the Gate. As the bill is changed weekly, and my regular acting and publicity work for the Gate goes on all the same and all the time, I am kept in a perpetual state of sweaty bliss!" (Orson Welles, undated letter to Roger Hill)) (Note: "While in Dublin, OW does a few productions of his own … and acts in several productions" (Jonathan Rosenbaum)) (Note: "He played forty roles that season at the Gate Theater, directed and designed sets at the famed Peacock Theater, made an occasional guest appearance at the Abbey." (Radio Guide))	
1931	The Lady from the Sea	Henrik Ibsen			Dublin	Orson Welles		
1931	Three Sisters	Anton Chekhov			Dublin		(Note: Set designer only)	
1931–32	Hay Fever	Noël Coward			Dublin	Orson Welles		
1931–32	Mr. Wu	Harry M. Vernon and Harold Owen	Mr. Wu		Dublin	Orson Welles		
1931–32	The Only Way	Frederick Longbridge and Freeman Wills			Dublin	Orson Welles		
1931–32	Peer Gynt	Henrik Ibsen	Peer Gynt		Dublin			
1931–32	The Father	August Strindberg	Acting role		Dublin			
1931–32	The Rivals	Richard Brinsley Sheridan	Acting role		Dublin			
1931–32	The Emperor Jones	Eugene O'Neill	Acting role		Dublin			
1931–32	La locandiera	Carlo Goldoni	Acting role		Dublin			
1931–32	The Play's the Thing	P. G. Wodehouse and Ferenc Molnár	Acting role		Dublin			
1931–32	Man and Superman	George Bernard Shaw	Acting role		Dublin			
1931–32	Grumpy	Horace Hodges and T. Wrigley Percival	Acting role		Dublin			
1931–32	The Makropulos Affair	Karel Čapek	Acting role		Dublin			
1931–32	The Dover Road	A. A. Milne	Acting role		Dublin			
1931–32	Volpone	Ben Jonson	Acting role		Dublin			
1931–32	Rope	Patrick Hamilton	Ronald Kentley		Dublin			
1931–32	Richard III	William Shakespeare	Acting role		Dublin			
1931–32	Macbeth	William Shakespeare	Acting role		Dublin			
1931–32	Timon of Athens	William Shakespeare	Acting role		Dublin			
1931–32	King John	William Shakespeare	Acting role		Dublin			

== 1932 ==
Date	Title	Author	Role	Company	Theatre	Director	Notes	References
January 12–26	Death Takes a Holiday	Alberto Casella, play Walter Ferris, adaptation	Baron Lamberto	Dublin Gate Theatre Company	Gate Theatre, Dublin	Hilton Edwards	(Note: The Irish Independent credits Welles with "an excellent impersonation".)	
February 2–13	Hamlet	William Shakespeare	The Ghost; Fortinbras	Dublin Gate Theatre Company	Gate Theatre, Dublin	Hilton Edwards	(Note: Cast: Micheál MacLiammóir (Hamlet), Hilton Edwards (Claudius), others) (Note: Denied the role of Othello, Welles resigns from the Gate in March.)	
1932	Doctor Knock	Jules Romains		Peacock Players	Peacock Theatre, Dublin		(Note: Set design only)	
1932	The Chinese Bungalow	Marion Osmond and James Corbet	acting role		Dublin	Orson Welles	(Note: Midnight benefit)	
February 16 - 27	The All Alone	Henry B O'Hanlon		The Dublin Repertory Theatre	Peacock Theatre, Dublin	William Sherwood	(Note: Set design only) (Note: Welles travels to London, where he is unable to obtain a work permit.) (Note: On March 9, Welles boards the RMS Olympic at Southampton, and arrives in New York March 15. On March 18, a Chicago Tribune headline reads, "Chicago Schoolboy Who Won Place on Dublin Stage Returns".)	

== 1933 ==
Date	Title	Author	Role	Company	Theatre	Director	Notes	References
May	Twelfth Night	William Shakespeare		Todd Troupers	Todd School for Boys	Roger Hill and Orson Welles	(Note: Welles was invited by Roger Hill to join the Todd faculty.) (Note: Welles co-directed this production using the edited version of the play that would appear in the book he wrote with Hill, Everybody's Shakespeare (1934). Welles designed the costumes and conceived and created the set—a 12-foot-high book with hand-painted pages that turned as scenes changed. Welles filmed most of a dress rehearsal—his very first film) (Note: Cast: Hascy Tarbox (Sir Andrew Aguecheek), Joanne Hill (Viola))	
July	Twelfth Night	William Shakespeare		Todd Troupers	Chicago Drama Festival, A Century of Progress Exposition, English Village	Roger Hill and Orson Welles	(Note: Todd School for Boys received first prize from the Chicago Drama League after competition at the Century of Progress Exposition (July–August), 1933 Chicago World's Fair.) (Note: Richard France: "A short film excerpt from it is still in the Hills' possession. Unfortunately, Welles's original staging was not used, only his set. A small backdrop is completely covered with a bright stylized rendering of a London street.") (Note: Cast: Hascy Tarbox (Sir Andrew Aguecheek), Joanne Hill (Viola))	
November 29– June 20, 1934	Romeo and Juliet	William Shakespeare	Mercutio; Chorus	Katharine Cornell repertory company	National tour beginning at the Erlanger Theatre in Buffalo, New York, Cornell's hometown	Guthrie McClintic	(Note: Orson Welles: "I was out on the road with Katharine Cornell for a whole year in the thirties … playing all over in theatres where no play had been for twenty, thirty, forty years. There we were, bringing really good actors and a repertoire of three plays …") (Note: Frank Brady: "And what a tour it was! Eight months, 17,000 miles, and 225 performances from New York to San Francisco, crisscrossing the United States and ending at the Brooklyn Academy of Music on June 20, 1934.") (Note: Cast: Katharine Cornell (Juliet), Basil Rathbone (Romeo), George Macready (Paris), John Hoysradt, Brenda Forbes, others) (Note: In repertory with The Barretts of Wimpole Street and Candida)	
December 2– June 20, 1934	The Barretts of Wimpole Street	Rudolf Besier	Octavius Moulton-Barrett	Katharine Cornell repertory company	National tour beginning at the Erlanger Theatre in Buffalo, New York	Guthrie McClintic	(Note: Cast: Katharine Cornell (Elizabeth Barrett), Basil Rathbone (Robert Browning), Margot Stevenson (Bella Hedley), Brenda Forbes (Wilson), George Macready, John Hoysradt, others) (Note: In repertory with Candida and Romeo and Juliet)	
December– June 20, 1934	Candida	George Bernard Shaw	Eugene Marchbanks	Katharine Cornell repertory company	National tour	Guthrie McClintic	(Note: Cast: Katharine Cornell (Candida), others; in repertory with The Barretts of Wimpole Street and Romeo and Juliet)	

== 1934 ==
Date	Title	Author	Role	Company	Theatre	Director	Notes	References
July 12–22	Trilby	George du Maurier	Svengali	Todd School for Boys	Woodstock Opera House	Orson Welles	(Note: This production launched The Todd Theatre Festival, a six-week summer festival organized by Welles.) (Note: Welles's American debut as a professional theatre director) (Note: Cast: Louise Prussing (Trilby), Hilton Edwards (Taffy), Micheál MacLiammóir (Little Billee), Virginia Nicolson (Angele), William Vance (Zouzou))	
July 26– August 5	Hamlet	William Shakespeare	Claudius; Ghost of Hamlet's Father	Todd School for Boys	Woodstock Opera House	Hilton Edwards	(Note: Chicago Tribune: "Orson Welles doubles as the ghost and the king. He reads the magnificent speeches of the ghost with fine effect, and adds new touches of character to the king. I have never before seen the murderous and incestuous Claudius acted except as an obvious and perfunctory villain. Welles, the twenty-year-old master of character, puts into the role suggestions of an exceeding corrupt Roman emperor.") (Note: Cast: Micheál MacLiammóir (Hamlet), Hilton Edwards (Polonius), Louise Prussing (Gertrude), Constance Heron (Ophelia), Charles O'Neal (Horatio), Clifford Baer (Laertes), William Vance (Fortinbras))	
August 9–19	Tsar Paul	Dmitry Merezhkovsky	Count Pahlen	Todd School for Boys	Woodstock Opera House	Hilton Edwards	(Note: Cast: Micheál MacLiammóir (Alexander), Constance Heron (Elizabeth), Hilton Edwards (Paul I), Robert Newman (Grand Duke), Richard Ogden (Lieutenant Marin), William Vance (General Talyzin), Charles O'Neal (Colonel Yashvil), William Mowrie (Colonel Argamakoff), Ralph O'Connor (General Bennigsen), William Yule (Baron Rosen), Louise Prussing (Princess Anna Gagarin))	
August 22–25	The Drunkard	William H. Smith	Cameo appearance	Todd School for Boys	Woodstock Opera House	Charles O'Neal	(Note: Peter Noble: "Roger Hill and his wife Hortense … prevailed upon Welles to produce that old-time temperance melodrama, The Drunkard … It was a riotous success … Hilton and Michael adored it and later produced it triumphantly at the Gate.") (Note: Cast: William Vance (Lawyer Cribbs))	
December 3–9	Romeo and Juliet	William Shakespeare	Tybalt; Chorus	Katharine Cornell repertory company	Cass Theatre, Detroit, Michigan	Guthrie McClintic	(Note: The first production of the new repertory season is a revised version of the play that toured 1933–34, choreographed by Martha Graham, with scenic design and costumes by Jo Mielziner and music by Paul Nordoff.) (Note: Virginia Welles Pringle: "Orson thought Brian Aherne was a terrible actor and very much resented losing Mercutio to him. He made Tybalt outstanding, however, and the changes of roles didn't hurt him at all. Aherne was absolutely necessary to Kit Cornell as Robert Browning in The Barretts of Wimpole Street and being something of a star, he wouldn't join the company unless he played Mercutio.") (Note: Cast: Katharine Cornell (Juliet), Basil Rathbone (Romeo), Brian Aherne (Mercutio), Edith Evans (Nurse), John Emery (Benvolio), George Macready (Paris), John Miltern (Montague), Moroni Olsen (Capulet), Charles Waldron (Friar Laurence), others) (Note: Pre-Broadway tour begins in Detroit followed by performances in Cleveland and Pittsburgh)	
December 10–11	Romeo and Juliet	William Shakespeare	Tybalt; Chorus	Katharine Cornell repertory company	Hanna Theatre, Cleveland, Ohio	Guthrie McClintic	(Note: Cast: Katharine Cornell (Juliet), Basil Rathbone (Romeo), Brian Aherne (Mercutio))	
December 14–15	Romeo and Juliet	William Shakespeare	Tybalt; Chorus	Katharine Cornell repertory company	Nixon Theatre, Pittsburgh, Pennsylvania	Guthrie McClintic	(Note: Cast: Katharine Cornell (Juliet), Basil Rathbone (Romeo), Brian Aherne (Mercutio))	
December 20– February 23, 1935	Romeo and Juliet	William Shakespeare	Tybalt; Chorus	Katharine Cornell repertory company	Martin Beck Theatre, New York City	Guthrie McClintic	(Note: Welles's Broadway debut) (Note: John Houseman: "That glossy and successful evening was marked for me by one astonishing vision … the excitement of the two brief moments when the furious Tybalt appeared suddenly in that sunlit Verona square: death, in scarlet and black, in the form of a monstrous boy—flat-footed and graceless, yet swift and agile; soft as jelly one moment and uncoiled, the next, in a spring of such furious energy that, once released, it could be checked by no human intervention.") (Note: Cast: Katharine Cornell (Juliet), Basil Rathbone (Romeo), Brian Aherne (Mercutio), Edith Evans (Nurse), John Emery (Benvolio), George Macready (Paris), Brenda Forbes (Lady Montague), Moroni Olsen (Capulet), William Hopper (Ensemble), others) (Note: About three weeks after seeing the December 21 performance, producer John Houseman secretly went backstage to introduce himself to Welles and recruit him to star in his production of a new play, Panic.)	

== 1935 ==
Date	Title	Author	Role	Company	Theatre	Director	Notes	References
March 14–16	Panic	Archibald MacLeish	McGafferty	Phoenix Theatre	Imperial Theatre, New York City	James Light	(Note: Co-produced by John Houseman, his first work with Welles: "And to his own part of the sexagenarian McGafferty, he brought us, as a free gift, the strength, the keen intelligence, the arrogance and the prodigious energy of his nineteen and a half years.") (Note: Set and lighting by Jo Mielziner, movement by Martha Graham) (Note: Cast: Rose McClendon (An Old Woman), Russell Collins (A Man), Joanna Roos (A Girl), Bernard Zanville (A Young Man), Paula Trueman (A Woman), Karl Swenson (A Young Man), George Glass (Immelman), Zita Johann (Ione), Richard Whorf (Griggs); Walter Coy, others (Bankers); Abner Biberman, William Challee, Paul Genge, Wesley Addy, others (Unemployed); Virginia Welles, Osceola Archer, Beatrice Pons, Mary Tarcai, others (Chorus)) (Note: On March 22, Welles made his debut on the CBS Radio series The March of Time, performing a scene from Panic for a news report on the stage production.)	

== 1936 ==
Date	Title	Author	Role	Company	Theatre	Director	Notes	References
April 12	Macbeth	William Shakespeare, play Orson Welles, adaptation		Federal Theatre Project	Lafayette Theatre, Harlem, New York City	Orson Welles	(Note: A free preview draws 3,000 more people than can be seated)	
April 14 – June 20	Macbeth	William Shakespeare, play Orson Welles, adaptation		Federal Theatre Project	Lafayette Theatre, Harlem, New York City	Orson Welles	(Note: The "Voodoo" Macbeth with an all-black cast, set on a mythical Caribbean island modeled upon 19th-century Haiti) (Note: Cast: Jack Carter (Macbeth), Edna Thomas (Lady Macbeth), Canada Lee (Banquo), Maurice Ellis (Macduff), Marie Young (Lady Macduff), Eric Burroughs (Hecate), Service Bell (Duncan), Wardell Saunders (Malcolm), Frank David (Ross), Thomas Anderson (Lennox), Archie Savage (Siward), George Nixon (First Murderer), Kenneth Renwick (Second Murderer), Laurence Chenault (The Doctor), Al Watts (The Priest), Philandre Thomas (First Messenger), Herbert Glynn (Second Messenger), J. Lewis Johnson (The Porter), Larrie Lauria (Seyton), Charles Collins (A Lord), Lisle Grenidge (First Captain), Ollie Simmons (Second Captain), William Cumberbatch (First Chamberlain), Benny Tattnall (Second Chamberlain), Chauncey Worrell (First Court Attendant), George Thomas (Second Court Attendant), Sarah Turner (First Page Boy), Beryle Banfield (Second Page Boy), Alma Dickson (The Duchess), Virginia Girvin (The Nurse), Bertram Holmes (Young Macduff), Wanda Macy (Daughter to Macduff), Carl Crawford (Fleance), Wilhelmina Williams (First Witch), Josephine Williams (Second Witch), Zola King (Third Witch), Abdul (Witch Doctor))	
July 6–18	Macbeth	William Shakespeare, play Orson Welles, adaptation		Federal Theatre Project	Adelphi Theatre, New York City	Orson Welles	(Note: Transfer of previous production) (Note: Jack Carter completed only Act I of the July 15 performance and was replaced by understudy Thomas Anderson.) (Note: Beginning July 16, Maurice Ellis stars as Macbeth, with Charles Collins succeeding Ellis in the role of Macduff.)	
July 21–25	Macbeth	William Shakespeare, play Orson Welles, adaptation		Federal Theatre Project	Park Theatre, Bridgeport, Connecticut	Orson Welles	(Note: Touring version of previous production)	
July 28 – August 1	Macbeth	William Shakespeare, play Orson Welles, adaptation		Federal Theatre Project	Hartford, Connecticut	Orson Welles	(Note: Touring version of previous production)	
August 6 – ?	Macbeth	William Shakespeare, play Orson Welles, adaptation		Federal Theatre Project	Exhibit Theatre, Dallas, Texas	Orson Welles	(Note: Touring version of previous production)	
August 13–23	Macbeth	William Shakespeare, play Orson Welles, adaptation		Federal Theatre Project	Amphitheater, Texas Centennial Exposition, Dallas, Texas	Orson Welles	(Note: Touring version of previous production, presented in the band shell of the new open-air amphitheater that seated 5,000) (Note: Integrated seating was a unique experience for theatergoers in Dallas.) (Note: Hallie Flanagan: "Dallas did see some excellent Federal Theatre productions. The Texas Centennial wanted Follow the Parade from Los Angeles, and the Negro Macbeth from New York.")	
August 25–29	Macbeth	William Shakespeare, play Orson Welles, adaptation		Federal Theatre Project	Keith's Theatre, Indianapolis, Indiana	Orson Welles	(Note: Touring version of previous production) (Note: Welles is sent to soothe inter-company quarrels that threaten the production; incognito, he performs the role of Macbeth at one performance when Ellis is ill.)	
September 1–13	Macbeth	William Shakespeare, play Orson Welles, adaptation		Federal Theatre Project	Great Northern Theater, Chicago, Illinois	Orson Welles	(Note: Touring version of previous production)	
September 1936	Macbeth	William Shakespeare, play Orson Welles, adaptation		Federal Theatre Project	Detroit, Michigan	Orson Welles	(Note: Touring version of previous production)	
September 1936	Macbeth	William Shakespeare, play Orson Welles, adaptation		Federal Theatre Project	Cleveland, Ohio	Orson Welles	(Note: Touring version of previous production)	
September 23–25	Macbeth	William Shakespeare, play Orson Welles, adaptation		Federal Theatre Project	Civic University, Syracuse, New York	Orson Welles	(Note: Three-day engagement concluding the 4,000-mile tour)	
September 26 – December 5	Horse Eats Hat	Eugène Labiche and Marc-Michel, play Orson Welles and Edwin Denby, adaptation	Mugglethorp	Federal Theatre Project	Maxine Elliott's Theatre, New York City	Orson Welles	(Note: Farce based on the French play Un chapeau de paille d'Italie) (Note: Cast: Joseph Cotten (Freddy), George Duthie (Entwhistle), Donald MacMillan (Uncle Adolphe), Dana Stephens (Queeper), Hiram Sherman (Bobbin), Sidney Smith (Grimshot, Lieutenant of Cavalry), Harry McKee (Joseph), France Bendtsen (Gustave, Viscount), Edgerton Paul (Augustus), Virginia Welles (Myrtle Mugglethorp), Paula Laurence (Agatha Entwhistle), Arlene Francis (Tillie), Sarah Burton (The Countess), Henriette Kaye (Daisy), Lucy Rodriguez (Clotilda), Bernard Savage (Corporal), Walter Burton (Butler), Steven Carter (First Footman), J. Headley (Second Footman), Enrico Cellini (Raguso), George Barter (Berkowitz), Bil Baird, Edwin Denby)	
October 6–17	Macbeth	William Shakespeare, play Orson Welles, adaptation		Federal Theatre Project	Majestic Theatre, Brooklyn, New York	Orson Welles	(Note: Touring version of previous production)	
October 23 – November 1	Ten Million Ghosts	Sidney Kingsley	André Pequot		St. James Theatre, New York City	Sidney Kingsley	(Note: Cast: Howard Solness (Foreman), Martin Gabel (Peter), Otto Hulett (Charlie Ryan), Barbara O'Neil (Madeleine), Joseph Singer (German Worker), Jan Ullrich (French Worker), George Coulouris (Zacharey), others)	

== 1937 ==
Date	Title	Author	Role	Company	Theatre	Director	Notes	References
January 8 – May 29	The Tragical History of Doctor Faustus	Christopher Marlowe	Faustus	Federal Theatre Project	Maxine Elliott Theatre, New York City	Orson Welles	(Note: Cast: Charles Peyton (the Pope), J. Headly (Cardinal of Lorraine), Bernard Savage (Valdes), Myron Paulson (Cornelius), Arthur Spencer (Wagner), William Hitch (First Scholar), Joseph Cotten (Second Scholar), Huntly Weston (Third Scholar), Harry McKee (Clown), Hiram Sherman (Robin), Wallace Acton (Ralph), George Smithfield (Vintner), George Duthie (Old Man), Edward Hemmer (First Friar), and Jack Carter (Mephisto))	
April 21–23	The Second Hurricane	Edwin Denby, libretto Aaron Copland, score		Henry Street Settlement Music School	Henry Street Settlement Playhouse, New York City	Orson Welles	(Note: Premiere of new opera; there were just three performances of the Welles production) (Note: Cast: Vivienne Block (Queenie), Estelle Levy (Gwen), Arthur Anderson (Gyp), Buddy Mangan (Lowrie), John Doepper (Butch), Harry Olive (Fat), Carl Crawford (Jeff), Clifford Mack (The Teacher), Joseph Cotten (Mr. MacLanahan), Charles Pettinger (Radio Operator))	
June 16 – July 1	The Cradle Will Rock	Marc Blitzstein		Federal Theatre Project	Venice Theatre, New York City	Orson Welles	(Note: Musical. Additional, one-off performances were given during this time on a Sunday in an amusement park in Bethlehem, Pennsylvania, and at Uncasville, New York.) (Note: Cast: Olive Stanton (Moll), George Fairchild (Gent, Gus Polock), Guido Alexander (Dick), Robert Farnsworth (Cop), Clifford Mack (Clerk), Bert Weston (Editor Daily), Hansford Wilson (President Prexy), Edward Fuller (Yasha), Warren Goddard (Dauber), Frank Marvel (Dr. Specialist), Edward Hemmer (Rev. Salvation), John Adair (Druggist), Will Geer (Mr. Mister), Peggy Coudray (Mrs. Mister), Hiram Sherman (Junior Mister, Prof. Skoot), Dulce Fox (Sister Mister), Josephine Heathman (Maid), Howard Bird (Steve), Geoffrey Powers (Bugs), Marian Grant Rudley (Sadie Polock), Howard da Silva (Larry Foreman), Leopold Badia (Prof. Mamie), George Smithfield (Prof. Trixie), Blanche Collins (Ella Hammer), Robert Hopkins (Reporter), Huntley Weston (Reporter), Jack Mealy (Reporter))	
Summer	The Cradle Will Rock	Marc Blitzstein		Federal Theatre Project	Tour of steel districts of Pennsylvania and Ohio	Orson Welles	(Note: Touring version of the earlier production)	
November 11 – May 28, 1938	Caesar	William Shakespeare, play Orson Welles, adaptation	Marcus Brutus	Mercury Theatre	Mercury Theatre, New York City	Orson Welles	(Note: First Mercury Theatre production, a modern staging of the Shakespeare play set amongst 1930s fascist dictators) (Note: Cast: Joseph Holland (Julius Caesar), George Coulouris (Marcus Antonius), Joseph Cotten (Publius), Martin Gabel (Cassius), Hiram Sherman (Casca), John A. Willard (Trebonius), Grover Burgess (Ligarius), John Hoysradt (Decius Brutus), Stefan Schnabel (Matellus Cimber), Elliott Reid (Cinna), William Mowry (Flavius), William Alland (Marullus), George Duthie (Artemidorus), Norman Lloyd (Cinna, the poet), Arthur Anderson (Lucius), Evelyn Allen (Calpurnia, wife to Caesar), Muriel Brassler (Portia, wife to Brutus), John Berry (extra)) (Note: Moved to the larger National Theatre January 24, 1938)	
December 5–19	The Cradle Will Rock	Marc Blitzstein		Mercury Theatre	Mercury Theatre, New York City	Orson Welles	(Note: First of the Mercury Theatre's experimental Worklight Theatre presentations offered on Sunday nights) (Note: Revised oratorio version using the Caesar set, with a 12-person chorus on the second platform. Chairs were placed in two rows on the first raised platform, from which the cast descended to the apron to join Marc Blitzstein at the piano for their individual scenes.)	
December 25	The Shoemaker's Holiday	Thomas Dekker		Mercury Theatre	Mercury Theatre, New York City	Orson Welles	(Note: Surprise preview performance immediately following Caesar) (Note: Welles invited the audience to stay and watch the set changes. Actor Norman Lloyd called the performance "the wildest triumph imaginable. The show was a smash during its run—but never again did we have a performance like that one.")	

== 1938 ==
Date	Title	Author	Role	Company	Theatre	Director	Notes	References
January 1 – April 28	The Shoemaker's Holiday	Thomas Dekker		Mercury Theatre	Mercury Theatre, New York City	Orson Welles	(Note: Moved to the National Theatre January 26)	
January 3 – April 2	The Cradle Will Rock	Marc Blitzstein		Mercury Theatre	Windsor Theatre and Mercury Theatre, New York City	Orson Welles	(Note: Revival of the 1937 musical) (Note: John Houseman: "So now during February and March, the Mercury had 124 actors performing in four shows in three theatres … within two blocks of each other on West 41st Street. We renamed it Mercury Street, and without permission from the city, put up temporary signs to that effect on the corners of 6th and 7th Avenues and Broadway.")	
April 29 – June 11	Heartbreak House	George Bernard Shaw	Captain Shotover	Mercury Theatre	Mercury Theatre, New York City	Orson Welles	(Note: Cast: Geraldine Fitzgerald (Ellie Dunn), Brenda Forbes (Nurse Guinness), Phyllis Joyce (Lady Utterword), Mady Christians (Hesione Hushabye), Erskine Sanford (Mazzini Dunn), Vincent Price (Hector Hushabye), John Hoysradt (Randall Utterword), Eustace Wyatt (The Burglar))	
August 16–29	Too Much Johnson	William Gillette, play Orson Welles, adaptation		Mercury Theatre	Stony Creek Theatre, Stony Creek, Connecticut	Orson Welles	(Note: Sets by James Marcom, costumes by Leo van Witsen, lighting by Jean Rosenthal) (Note: Motion picture sequences that were to provide exposition had to be abandoned due to the theater's lack of projection facilities, resulting in plot confusion that contributed to the play's failure.) (Note: Bret Wood: "The multi-media concept was a throwback to the early age of cinema when vaudeville shows were punctuated by quick cinematic vignettes.") (Note: Cast: Eustace Wyatt (Faddish), Edgar Barrier (Dathis), Anna Stafford [Virginia Welles] (Lenore Faddish), Guy Kingsley (MacIntosh), Joseph Cotten (Augustus Billings), Ruth Ford (Mrs. Billings), Mary Wickes (Mrs. Battison), George Duthie (Purser), Richard Wilson (Cabin Boy), Howard Smith (Johnson), Erskine Sanford (Frederic))	
November 2–19	Danton's Death	Georg Büchner	Louis Antoine de Saint-Just	Mercury Theatre	Mercury Theatre, New York City	Orson Welles	(Note: Cast: Anna Stafford [Virginia Welles] (Julie), Martin Gabel (Danton), Edgar Barrier (Camille Desmoulins), Evelyn Wahle (Lucile), Morgan Farley (Herault de Sechelles), William Mowry (Philippeau), Guy Kingsley (Lacroix), Ellen Andrews (A Lady), Vladimir Sokoloff (Robespierre), Arlene Francis (Marion), Ruth Ford (Rosalie), Rosemary Carver (Adelaide), Richard Wilson (Mercier), Eustace Wyatt (Fouquier), Joseph Cotten (Barrerre); William Alland, Edgerton Paul, Stanley Poss (Servants to Danton); Richard Baer, Ross Elliott (Convention Attendants)) (Note: Songs by Marc Blitzstein: "Christine" sung by Joseph Cotten and Mary Wickes, and "Ode to Reason" sung by Adelyn Colla Negri)	

== 1939 ==
Date	Title	Author	Role	Company	Theatre	Director	Notes	References
February 27 – March	Five Kings (Part One)	William Shakespeare, dialogue Orson Welles, adaptation	Sir John Falstaff	Mercury Theatre	Colonial Theatre, Boston	Orson Welles	(Note: A Theatre Guild and Mercury Theatre presentation produced by John Houseman) (Note: Original, five-hour version with two intermissions) (Note: John Houseman: "The first half of Five Kings, which included a fragment of Richard II, the two parts of Henry IV, and Henry V, was to be presented on its subscription series by the Guild … If successful it was to be followed by a second evening—all three parts of Henry VI and Richard III—to be rehearsed during the run of the first.") (Note: Music by Aaron Copland; sets by Jean Rosenthal—notably a revolving platform 30 feet in diameter "which kept circling like a lazy Susan without blackouts or visible sceneshifts in a great variety of forms throughout the play's thirty-two scenes" (John Houseman)) (Note: Cast: Robert Speaight (Chorus), Morris Ankrum (Henry IV), Burgess Meredith (Prince Hal, later Henry V), Richard Baer (Clarence), Guy Kingsley (Gloucester), John Emery (Hotspur), others)	
March 13 – ?	Five Kings (Part One)	William Shakespeare, dialogue Orson Welles, adaptation	Sir John Falstaff	Mercury Theatre	National Theatre, Washington, D.C.	Orson Welles	(Note: Welles had cut 40 minutes of the production's running time) (Note: Richard France: "No one was more insistent than Welles on presenting Five Kings in all its fulsomeness, and he did so in spite of the Theatre Guild's continuing demands that, if only in the interests of a conventional running time, the production be cut. His stage manager, Walter Ash, still blames the Guild for the demise of Five Kings.")	
March 20–25	Five Kings (Part One)	William Shakespeare, dialogue Orson Welles, adaptation	Sir John Falstaff	Mercury Theatre	Chestnut Street Opera House, Philadelphia	Orson Welles	(Note: Five Kings (Part One) did not make it to New York, and its failure meant that the planned Five Kings (Part Two) was never produced.) (Note: Richard France: "Throughout the tour of Five Kings, Welles grappled with this seemingly impenetrable mountain of material. In his dispatch to the New York Herald-Tribune, columnist Herbert Drake suggests that, had Welles been given the extra week of uninterrupted rehearsal time that he had requested of the Guild, Five Kings might today be recognized as Welles's theatrical masterpiece.")	
July–August	The Green Goddess	William Archer	Rajah	Mercury Theatre	RKO Vaudeville Theatre circuit (tour)	Orson Welles	(Note: Short 20-minute play, including a five-minute film segment, performed on tour)	

== 1941 ==
Date	Title	Author	Role	Company	Theatre	Director	Notes	References
March 24 – June 28	Native Son	Paul Green and Richard Wright		Mercury Theatre	St. James Theatre, New York City	Orson Welles	(Note: Brooks Atkinson: "Out of Richard Wright's novel, Native Son, Mr. Wright and Paul Green have written a powerful drama. Orson Welles has staged it with imagination and force. Those are the first things to be said about the overwhelming play that opened at the St. James last evening. But they hardly convey the excitement of the first performance of a play that represents experience of life and conviction in thought and a production that represents a dynamic use of the stage. … In staging it Mr. Welles picks up the bravura style of the Mercury Theatre where he left it two or three seasons ago. In ten savory scenes, acted on different levels with a resourceful use of the stage, he runs through the narrative, giving motion to static scenes by flares of light and putting Native Son into its urban environment by a varied use of sound accompaniment. Mr. Welles is a dramatic showman; he likes big scenes, broad sweeps of color and vigorous contrasts in tempo. He likes theatre that tingles with life.") (Note: Cast: Canada Lee (Bigger Thomas), Evelyn Ellis (Hannah Thomas), Helen Martin (Vera Thomas), Lloyd Warren (Buddy Thomas), Jacqueline Ghant Andre (A Neighbour), Eileen Burns (Miss Emmett), J. Flashe Riley (Jack), Rena Mitchell (Clara), Rodester Timmons (G.H. Rankin), Wardell Saunders (Gus Mitchell), C.M. Bootsie Davis (Ernie Jones), Erskine Sanford (Mr. Dalton), Nell Harrison (Mrs. Dalton), Everett Sloane (Britten), Frances Bavier (Peggy), Anne Burr (Mary Dalton), Joseph Pevney (Jan Erlone), Philip Bourneuf as Buckley), Ray Collins (Paul Max), Paul Stewart (A Reporter), William Malone (Judge); John Berry, Stephen Roberts, George Zorn, Don Roberts (Newspaper Men)) (Note: Actual Stage Timing, Court Room Scene, from the Mercury Theatre Production of Native Son (1941). Orson Welles reads the role of defense attorney Paul Max.)	

== 1942 ==
Date	Title	Author	Role	Company	Theatre	Director	Notes	References
October 23 – January 2, 1943	Native Son	Paul Green and Richard Wright		Mercury Theatre	Majestic Theatre, New York City	Orson Welles	(Note: Revival of 1941 production)	

== 1943 ==
Date	Title	Author	Role	Company	Theatre	Director	Notes	References
August 3 – September 9	The Mercury Wonder Show	Orson Welles and others	"Orson the Magnificent"	Mercury Theatre	Cahuenga Tent, Cahuenga Boulevard, Hollywood	Orson Welles	(Note: Variety show) (Note: Cast: Joseph Cotten ("Jo-Jo the Great"), Agnes Moorehead ("Calliope Aggie"), others) (Note: Rita Hayworth appeared as herself—and after Hayworth was forced out of the production by her studio contract, her part was filled by Marlene Dietrich.)	
September 1943 – 1944	The Mercury Wonder Show	Orson Welles and others	"Orson the Magnificent"	Mercury Theatre	Nationwide tour of army bases	Orson Welles	(Note: Variety show, previously mounted in Hollywood)	

== 1946 ==
Date	Title	Author	Role	Company	Theatre	Director	Notes	References
April 1–2	The Airborne Symphony	Marc Blitzstein	Speaker	New York City Symphony Orchestra	New York City Center, New York	Leonard Bernstein	(Note: World premiere of a symphony that presents the history of human flight, narrated by Welles) (Note: Commissioned in 1943 by the United States Army, officially dedicated to the Eighth Air Force) (Note: Soloists Charles Holland, tenor, and Walter Scheff, baritone, with the male section of the Collegiate Chorale) (Note: Recorded in 1966 with Welles as narrator and Bernstein conducting the New York Philharmonic)	
April 28–May 4	Around the World	Jules Verne, novel Orson Welles, adaptation Cole Porter, music	Inspector Dick Fix; Japanese magician	Mercury Theatre	Boston Opera House, Boston	Orson Welles	(Note: Musical; preview of the below Broadway production) (Note: Cast: Arthur Margetson (Phileas Fogg), Mary Healy (Mrs. Aouda), Julie Warren (Molly Muggins), Larry Laurence (Pat Passepartout), Victoria Cordova (Lola), Stefan Schnabel (Avery Jevity), Brainerd Duffield (Mr. Benjamin Cruett-Spew), Dorothy Bird (Meerahlah), Guy Spaull (Ralph Runcbile), Bernard Savage (Sir Charles Mandiboy))	
May 7–11	Around the World	Jules Verne, novel Orson Welles, adaptation Cole Porter, music	Inspector Dick Fix; Japanese magician	Mercury Theatre	Shubert Theatre, New Haven	Orson Welles	(Note: Musical; preview of the below Broadway production)	
May 31 – August 1	Around the World	Jules Verne, novel Orson Welles, adaptation Cole Porter, music	Inspector Dick Fix; Japanese magician	Mercury Theatre	Adelphi Theatre, New York City	Orson Welles	(Note: Musical. Despite relatively healthy ticket sales, the extravagance of the staging meant that the production lost a fortune.)	

== 1947 ==
Date	Title	Author	Role	Company	Theatre	Director	Notes	References
May 28–31	Macbeth	William Shakespeare	Macbeth	Mercury Production, Utah Centennial Festival	Kingsbury Hall, University of Utah, Salt Lake City	Orson Welles	(Note: Six performances presented by the Utah Centennial Commission and University Theatre in cooperation with American National Theatre and Academy) (Note: Staged in preparation for the film version shot in June 1947, with the same principal cast) (Note: Set design by Robert Shapiro, costumes by Ricki Grisman, executive director Richard Wilson, stage manager William Alland, production coordinator Emerson Crocker, executive secretary Michael Zimring) (Note: Cast: Dan O'Herlihy (Macduff), Jeanette Nolan (Lady Macbeth), Roddy McDowall (Malcolm), Erskine Sanford (Duncan), Edgar Barrier (Banquo), Brainerd Duffield (First Witch, First Murderer), Sereta Jones (Second Witch), Virginia McGrew (Third Witch), Roy Gibson (Ross), John McIntire (Friar), Richard Crane and William Campbell (Messengers), Robert Russon (Fleance) Ross Ramsey (Porter), Keene Curtis (Seyton), Joseph Bywater (Lennox), William Alland (Second Murderer), Joyce Barlow (Lady Macduff), John Covey (Son to Macduff), Georgiana Lees (Daughter to Macduff, Gentlewoman), Ross Dalton (Doctor), John Nocolaysen (Old Siward), Arch Heugly (Young Siward))	

== 1950 ==
Date	Title	Author	Role	Company	Theatre	Director	Notes	References
June 15 – July	The Blessed and the Damned	Orson Welles	Various (Lobster); Faustus (Time Runs…)		Théâtre Édouard VII, Paris	Orson Welles	(Note: Compilation of two one-act plays, each written by Welles: The Unthinking Lobster and Time Runs... Cast of The Unthinking Lobster included Marcel Archard, Georges Baume, Frédéric O'Brady and Maurice Bessy. Cast of Time Runs… included Eartha Kitt as Helen of Troy.)	
August 7 – August	An Evening With Orson Welles	Orson Welles; Oscar Wilde	Faustus (Time Runs…); Algernon (Earnest)		Altjakobstheater am Zoo, Frankfurt	Hilton Edwards	(Note: Compilation of the one-act Orson Welles play The Unthinking Lobster, and a heavily abridged one-act condensation of the Oscar Wilde play The Importance of Being Earnest. The cast of The Unthinking Lobster were as above.)	
August 15 – August	An Evening With Orson Welles	Orson Welles; Oscar Wilde	Faustus (Time Runs…); Algernon (Earnest)		Hamburg	Hilton Edwards	(Note: Compilation of the one-act Orson Welles play The Unthinking Lobster, and a heavily abridged one-act condensation of the Oscar Wilde play The Importance of Being Earnest. The cast of The Unthinking Lobster were as above.)	
August 21 – August	An Evening With Orson Welles	Orson Welles; Oscar Wilde	Faustus (Time Runs…); Algernon (Earnest)		Munich	Hilton Edwards	(Note: Compilation of the one-act Orson Welles play The Unthinking Lobster, and a heavily abridged one-act condensation of the Oscar Wilde play The Importance of Being Earnest. The cast of The Unthinking Lobster were as above. On 30 August, Welles did film both segments (along with the final scene of Henry IV, Part 2) at the Geisengeige Studios outside Munich, but disposed of the footage after he was dissatisfied with the result.)	

== 1951 ==
Date	Title	Author	Role	Company	Theatre	Director	Notes	References
October 1–7	Othello	William Shakespeare	Othello		Theatre Royal, Newcastle	Orson Welles	(Note: Preview of the West End run below) (Note: Cast: Gudrun Ure (Desdemona), Peter Finch (Iago), Basil Lord (Roderigo), John Van Eyssen (Cassio), Keith Pyott (Brabantio), Aubrey Richards (The Duke), Edward Mulhare (Lodovico), Maxine Audley (Emilia), Michael Warre (Montano), Dianne Foster (Bianca), Edmund Purdom)	
October 18 – December 15	Othello	William Shakespeare	Othello		St James's Theatre, London	Orson Welles	(Note: Cast as above. Notably, Winston Churchill attended this production as recalled in a later interview by Welles.)	
November	Midnight Matinee	Orson Welles	Himself		Coliseum Theatre, London	Orson Welles	(Note: Late-night magic and variety act Welles did concurrently with the West End run of Othello)	

== 1953 ==
Date	Title	Author	Role	Company	Theatre	Director	Notes	References
September 7 – October	The Lady in the Ice	Orson Welles, libretto Jean-Michel Damase, score		Ballet de Paris	Stoll Theatre, London	Orson Welles	(Note: Ballet with cast including Colette Marchand, Georges Reich and Joe Milan)	
October	Une femme dans la glace	Orson Welles, libretto Jean-Michel Damase, score		Ballet de Paris	Paris	Orson Welles	(Note: French version of the ballet The Lady in the Ice)	

== 1955 ==
Date	Title	Author	Role	Company	Theatre	Director	Notes	References
June 16 – July 9	Moby Dick—Rehearsed	Herman Melville, novel Orson Welles, play	An Actor-Manager; Father Mapple; Captain Ahab		Duke of York's Theatre, London	Orson Welles	(Note: Minimalist production of a play about a group of 19th-century actors rehearsing a play of Moby Dick) (Note: Cast: Gordon Jackson (A Young Actor/Ishmael), Christopher Lee )(A Stage Manager/Flask; replaced by Peter Sallis later in the run), Patrick McGoohan (A Serious Actor/Starbuck), Wensley Pithey (A Middle-Aged Actor/Stubb), Joan Plowright (A Young Actress/Pip), Kenneth Williams (A Very Serious Actor/Elijah and others), Joseph Chelton (A Manager/Tashtego), John Gray (An Assistant Stage Manager/Bo'sun), Jefferson Clifford (An Experienced Actor/Peleg))	

== 1956 ==
Date	Title	Author	Role	Company	Theatre	Director	Notes	References
January 12–29	King Lear	William Shakespeare	King Lear	New York City Center Theater Company	Lincoln Center Theater, New York City	Orson Welles	(Note: A New Mercury Theatre Production) (Note: Cast: Robert Blackburn (King of France), Walter Mathews (Duke of Burgundy, Doctor), Sorrell Brooke (Duke of Albany), Thayer David (Duke of Cornwall), Roy Dean (Earl of Kent), Lester Rawlins (Earl of Gloucester), Robert Fletcher (Edgar), John Colicos (Edmund), Tom Clancy (Curan), Francis Carpenter (Oswald), Jack Aronson (Old Man, Gentleman to King Lear), Robert Burr (Servant to Cornwall, Captain to Edmund), Geraldine Fitzgerald (Goneril), Sylvia Short (Regan), Viveca Lindfors (Cordelia))	
February 22 – March 13	Variety act	Orson Welles	Himself		Riviera Hotel, Las Vegas	Orson Welles	(Note: 25-minute one-person show, assisted by Kirk and Phyllis Kirkham) (Note: Magic show and Shakespearean readings from Julius Caesar, King Lear and The Merchant of Venice)	

== 1960 ==
Date	Title	Author	Role	Company	Theatre	Director	Notes	References
February 13–18	Chimes at Midnight	William Shakespeare, dialogue Orson Welles, adaptation	Sir John Falstaff	Gate Theatre Company	Grand Opera House, Belfast	Hilton Edwards	(Note: Adapted from Henry IV, Part 1, Henry IV, Part 2, Henry V, Richard III and The Merry Wives of Windsor) (Note: Cast: Hilton Edwards (Narrator), Reginald Jarman (Henry IV), Keith Baxter (Hal, Prince of Wales, later King Henry V), Peter Bartlett (Prince John of Lancaster; Peto), Stuart Nichol (Earl of Westmoreland), Terence Greenidge (Lord Chief Justice; Henry Percy, Earl of Northumberland), Alan Mason (Gower), John Southarn (Page to Gower), Orson Welles (Sir John Falstaff), Shirley Cameron (Doll Tearsheet), Thelma Ruby (Mistress Quickly), Keith Marsh (Justice Robert Shallow), Aubrey Morris (Master Silence; Thomas Percy, Earl of Worcester), Patrick Bedford (Ned Poins), Rory Macdermott (Pistol; Sheriff Fang; Chorus), Leonard Fenton (Bardolf), Henry Woolf (Nym), Lee Harris (Francis, a Drawer), Alexis Kanner (Harry Percy, known as Hotspur))	
March 1 – March	Chimes at Midnight	William Shakespeare, dialogue Orson Welles, adaptation	Sir John Falstaff	Gate Theatre Company	Gaiety Theatre, Dublin	Hilton Edwards	(Note: Transfer of the above production) (Note: Welles's last performance as an actor in the theatre)	
April 28 – June 7	Rhinoceros	Eugène Ionesco		English Stage Company	Royal Court Theatre, London	Orson Welles	(Note: Welles's last stage production) (Note: Cast: Monica Evans (Bessie), Laurence Olivier (Berenger), Duncan Macrae (John), Henry Woolf (A Grocer), Margery Caldicott (The Grocer's Wife), Hazel Hughes (A Lady with a Cat), Geoffrey Lumsden (A Logician), Michael Bates (An Old Gentleman), Will Stampe (A Publican), Joan Plowright (Daisy), Alan Webb (Duddard), Miles Malleson (Mr. Butterfly), Peter Sallis (Bottard), Gladys Henson (Mrs. Beef), Philip Anthony (A Fireman))	
June 8 – July 30	Rhinoceros	Eugène Ionesco		English Stage Company	Strand Theatre, London	Orson Welles	(Note: By the time the play had transferred to its new venue, Welles had ceased to be associated with the production, with its star Laurence Olivier having taken over as de facto director. However, the production's innovative set design remained Welles's. The cast remained as above, except with Maggie Smith taking over from Joan Plowright as Daisy, and Michael Gough taking over from Alan Webb as Duddard.)	
