= Anything Goes (1956 film) =

1956 American musical film directed by Robert Lewis

- Theatrical release poster
- Directed by: Robert Lewis
- Screenplay by: Sidney Sheldon; Howard Lindsay
- Based on: Anything Goes by Guy Bolton and P. G. Wodehouse
- Produced by: Robert Emmett Dolan
- Starring: Bing Crosby; Donald O'Connor; Zizi Jeanmaire; Mitzi Gaynor; Phil Harris
- Cinematography: John F. Warren
- Edited by: Frank Bracht
- Music by: Nick Castle; Joseph J. Lilley; Van Cleave
- Production company: Paramount Pictures
- Distributed by: Paramount Pictures
- Release date: April 13, 1956 (US)
- Running time: 106 minutes
- Country: United States
- Language: English
- Box office: $2.1 million (US)

Anything Goes is a 1956 American musical film directed by Robert Lewis, and starring Bing Crosby, Donald O'Connor, Zizi Jeanmaire, and Mitzi Gaynor. Adapted from the 1934 stage musical Anything Goes by Cole Porter, Guy Bolton, and P. G. Wodehouse, the film is about two entertainers scheduled to appear in a Broadway show who travel to Europe, where each discovers the perfect leading lady for the female role. Bing Crosby's character, Bill Benson, goes to England and meets Mitzi Gaynor's character Patsy Blair, and he signs her as the female lead. Meanwhile, Donald O'Connor's character, Ted Adams, travels to France and meets Jeanmaire's character, Gaby Duval, and he signs her to the same role. On the return voyage, with each man having brought his leading lady along, the Atlantic becomes a stormy crossing when each man must tell his discovery that she might not get the role.

Paramount had already (1936) released a musical film version that followed the plot of the original stage musical. The book for this 1956 film version, also released by Paramount, was drastically rewritten. Although this version again stars Crosby (whose character was renamed), the film replaces most of the original characters and follows a new plot. It features almost no similarities to the musical stage production, apart from some songs, the presence of a ship crossing the Atlantic and the title.

== Plot ==
Showbiz partners Bill Benson and Ted Adams each travel to Paris to sign a dancer to star in their new show. The problem? There is only one role, and the men have unknowingly cast two dancers, Patsy Blair and Gaby Duval. It is up to the men to sort out their mess on the transatlantic crossing back to the United States.

== Cast ==
- Bing Crosby as Bill Benson
- Donald O'Connor as Ted Adams
- Mitzi Gaynor as Patsy Blair
- Zizi Jeanmaire as Gaby Duval
- Phil Harris as Steve Blair
- Kurt Kasznar as Victor Lawrence
- Richard Erdman as Ed Brent
- Walter Sande as Alex Todd
- Archer MacDonald as Otto
- Argentina Brunetti as Suzanne
- Alma Macrorie as French Baroness
- Dorothy Neumann as German Woman
- James Griffith as Paul Holiday

== Production ==
Filming took place in April and May 1955. The primary musical numbers ("Anything Goes", "You're the Top", "I Get a Kick Out of You", "It's De-Lovely", and "Blow, Gabriel, Blow") appear in the film with updated arrangements, while the lesser-known Porter songs were cut completely, and new songs, written by Jimmy Van Heusen and Sammy Cahn, were substituted. These substitutions ranged from the lively tap number by Donald O'Connor with bouncy children and as many bouncy balls ("You Can Bounce Right Back") to crazy kitsch ("Second-hand Turban"). Musical numbers were staged by Nick Castle, with the "Anything Goes" number staged by Ernie Flatt, and Roland Petit providing the choreography of "I Get a Kick Out of You" for his wife Zizi Jeanmaire.

== Reception ==
The Variety reviewer said: "It’s a bright offering for Easter release, geared to play an engaging tune at the wickets. Male topliners Bing Crosby and Donald O’Connor go together as though born to give the zip to what scripter Sidney Sheldon has concocted hereunder the stage title. While there are Cole Porter songs and the legit handle is still carried, that’s about all that remains of what went on behind the footlights, and there’s scant resemblance to Paramount's 1936 film version, in which Crosby also starred with Ethel Merman".

A. H. Weiler, writing for The New York Times, thought that, "For all its activity, Anything Goes is, in the main, standard musical comedy. Some of the principals are decidedly decorative and talented. The script, however, is transparent and fragile."

== Soundtrack ==
Anything Goes

Soundtrack album by the Original Cast
- Released: June 1956
- Recorded: 1956
- Genre: Stage and screen
- Length: 45:10
- Label: Decca Records
- Producer: Joseph Lilley

The original soundtrack album was released by Decca Records and includes a mix of soundtrack performances and studio re-creations.

1. "Ya Gotta Give the People Hoke" (Crosby and O'Connor) – This is from the film soundtrack.
2. "Anything Goes" (Gaynor) – The orchestra track is from the film, but Gaynor overdubs a new and different vocal.
3. "I Get a Kick Out of You" (Jeanmaire) – This is from the film soundtrack, although the sound quality fluctuates between the vocals and the dance music.
4. "You're the Top" (Crosby and Gaynor) – This is a studio recording with an arrangement totally different from that presented in the film. On screen the number is done as a double duet with Crosby and Gaynor rehearsing in one room while O'Connor and Jeanmaire rehearse in an adjoining room. The recorded version is less complete and has some different lyrics.
5. "Dream Ballet" (Orchestra) – This is taken from the soundtrack with the addition "Let's Do It" at the very beginning, which was edited out of the final print of the film.
6. "It's De-Lovely" (O'Connor and Gaynor) – This is from the film soundtrack with dialogue removed.
7. "All Through the Night" (Crosby) – This is a studio re-recording with Crosby singing at a slightly faster tempo.
8. "A Second Hand Turban and a Crystal Ball" (Crosby and O'Connor) – This is the full routine (with a few slight dialogue abridgments) taken from the film soundtrack.
9. "You Can Bounce Right Back" (O'Connor) – This is from the film soundtrack.
10. "Blow, Gabriel, Blow" (Full cast) – This is from the soundtrack, but remixed to remove the chorus and adding some verses not heard in the finished film.

The album stayed in Decca's catalog until 1969 when it was discontinued. In 2004, Decca Broadway re-released the recording on CD with three additional Crosby tracks: "Sailor Beware", "My Heart and I", and "Moonburn".

== See also ==
- List of American films of 1956
