= Antoni Clavé =

Costume designer

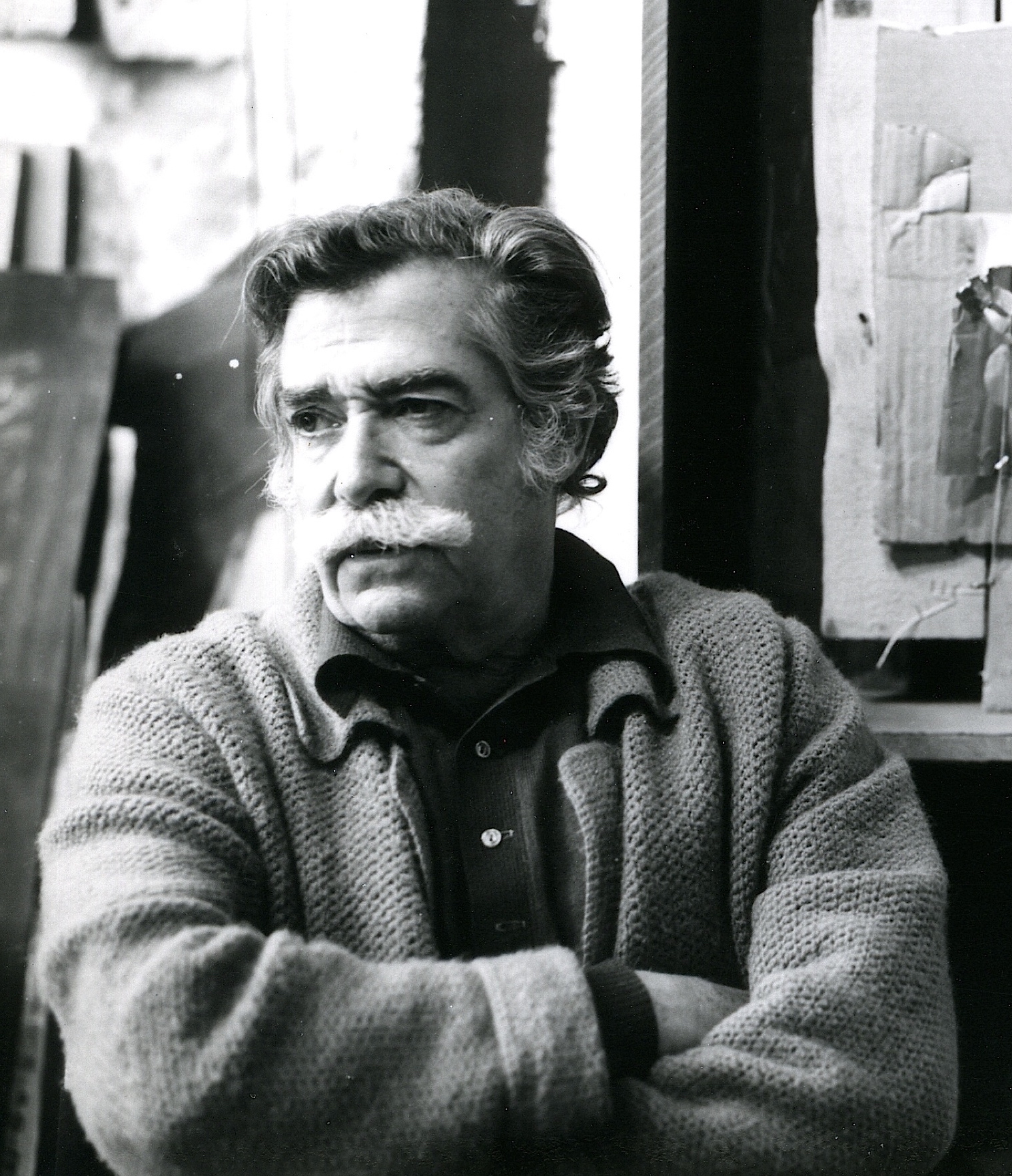
- Born: 5 April 1913; Barcelona, Spain
- Died: 31 August 2005 (aged 92); St Tropez, France
- Other name: Clavé
- Occupations: Artist, costume designer
- Years active: 1952–1980
- Website: http://www.antoni-clave.org

Antoni Clavé (5 April 1913 – 31 August 2005) was a Catalan master painter, printmaker, sculptor, stage designer and costume designer. He was nominated for two Academy Awards (Best Art Direction and Best Costume Design) for his work on the 1952 film Hans Christian Andersen.

Clavé was one of Spain's best known and most celebrated artists. His work evolved from a baroque, ornamental style to a pure, minimal aesthetic. In his later years, his work is completely abstract, employing expressive lines and exploring the boundaries of collage, objet trove, shading, texture and color. He was trained at the School of Fine Arts, Barcelona, where he was taught by Angel Ferrant and Felix Mestres. With his works being influenced by artists such as Bonnard, Vuillard and Roualt. He is best known for his lyrical abstractions, works which combine paint with collage.

== Biography ==
Clavé fought in the Republican Army in the Spanish Civil War, and served as draughtsman for the Republican government. He arrived in France as a refugee in 1939 and went straight to Paris to work as an illustrator. His first one-man exhibition was held at the Au sans Pareil bookshop, 37 Avenue Kléber in Paris in 1940, where Max Ernst and other leading figures from the Dada movement had their first exhibitions in the 1920s. In 1944 Clavé met Picasso and began making figure compositions that were deeply influenced by Picasso's work, featuring kings, harlequins, children, and still lives.

His theatrical designs have appeared on stages in New York, Munich, London and Paris, as well as in the 1952 film Hans Christian Andersen. His works include sets for opera, theatre, and ballet, most notably for Roland Petit's ballet company, Les Ballets des Champs Elysees (1945-1951) including Los Caprichos (1946) Carmen (1949) and a comic ballet choreographed by Roland Petit called Deuil en 24 Heures. In 1951 he designed La maison de Bernarda Alba (The House of Bernarda Alba) for director Marcel Achard at the Theatre de l'Oeuvre in Paris, and in 1962, a production of The Marriage of Figaro for Maurice Sarrazin at Théatre de la cour de l'Archeveché in Aix-en-Provence.

In 1957 Clavé began to design carpets and from 1960 he began to work on sculptural bas reliefs, assemblages and totem-like sculptures of wood and modelled or imprinted lead. He also used some objets trouvé. In 1965 Clavé moved to the South of France, near Saint-Tropez.

His work is displayed in many museums, including the Fine Arts Museums of San Francisco, National Museum of Serbia, Museo Patio Herreriano de Valladolid in Spain Museo Patio Herresriano, Tate Gallery, London, Museo de Bellas Artes de Bilbao, Museum of Modern Art, Paris, Museo Nacional de Arte Reina Sofia Museo Arte Reina Sofia, Madrid, the Museum of Modern Art in Tokyo and The British Museum, London.
