= Serge Perrault =

French choreographer

- Born: Serge Leplat; 1920; Paris, France
- Died: 13 March 2014; Agon, Normandy, France
- Occupation(s): Ballet dancer and teacher

Serge Perrault (1920 – 13 March 2014) was a French ballet dancer and teacher.

== Biography ==
Born Serge Leplat in Paris in 1920, he was the half-brother of the dancer Lycette Darsonval. He trained at the Paris Opera School alongside Lucette Almanzor, the second wife of writer Louis-Ferdinand Céline. He attended the ballet corps of the opera from 1943 to 1947.

During the occupation of France during the Second World War, Perrault avoided the Service du travail obligatoire by seeking refuge with Gen Paul and Céline.

He performed the role of the Toreador in Carmen by Roland Petit in London in 1949. He danced with stars like Michel Renaud, Lycette Darsonval, and Yvette Chauviré. He performed as a comedian-dancer in the troupe of Jean-Louis Barrault during a production of Hamlet, which toured the United States in 1952.

In 1957, Perrault played the role of Max in the film Folies-Bergère directed by Henri Decoin.

Perrault also worked as a dance teacher. Beginning in 1957, first at the Conservatoire de Créteil, he later moved to give dance lessons as a "professor of improvement" at the School of the Paris Opera between 1977 and 1987. In 1996, he became a professor of pedagogy at the Paris Opera.

Perrault died on 13 March 2014 at the age of 93 in Agon, Normandy.
