= Black Tights =

1961 film

- French theatrical poster
- Directed by: Terence Young
- Screenplay by: Roland Petit
- Based on: Cyrano de Bergerac by Edmond Rostand; Carmen by Roland Petit; Carmen by Georges Bizet
- Produced by: Joseph Kaufman
- Starring: Cyd Charisse; Moira Shearer; Zizi Jeanmaire; Roland Petit; Maurice Chevalier; Georges Reich; Dirk Sanders
- Cinematography: Henri Alekan
- Edited by: Françoise Javet
- Music by: Marius Constant
- Production company: Grandes Productions Cinématographiques
- Distributed by: Les Artistes Associés (France); Magna (United States)
- Release date: May 9, 1961
- Running time: 140 minutes
- Country: France
- Languages: French; English

Black Tights (1-2-3-4 ou Les Collants noirs) is a 1961 French anthology film featuring four ballet segments shot in Technirama and directed by Terence Young.

The dances in the film were abridged versions of ballets created for the stage by the dancer and choreographer Roland Petit, who appears in the three of the four sequences along with his wife, the ballerina Zizi Jeanmaire.

The film is also known as Un deux trois quatre! in France (short title).

== Plot summary ==
The four independent stories are performed in the form of ballet, interspersed with introductions by Maurice Chevalier. In two of them (Cyrano de Bergerac and Carmen), he periodically explains events as the story progresses.

La Croqueuse de diamants translates as The Gold Digger, or more literally as "the diamond cruncher". (Twice during the story, the title character swallows a diamond, with a crunching sound.) The story, a romantic comedy, opens in Les Halles. Amid the hubbub of street activity, a group of woman street vendors sing in French about their trade. A furniture delivery man, while delivering a seating banquette to a café, encounters a woman pickpocket, who is the leader of a pickpocketing gang, based next door to the café. The delivery man and the gold digger fall in love with each other, the latter leaving her criminal gang to go off with her new love.

Cyrano de Bergerac is a tragic romantic story, based on a play of the same name. Both Cyrano de Bergerac and Christian de Neuvillette love Roxanne. But the poet Cyrano has a big nose and is too shy to declare his love to Roxanne. Instead, he helps his friend Christian woo Roxanne, writing love letters on his behalf.

Deuil en 24 heures translates as "mourning in 24 hours" or more loosely as A Merry Mourning. (A shop appearing in the film shows "Deuil en 24 heures" as the shop name.) Along the Champs-Élysées, a wealthy man accompanies his wife on a shopping trip to buy a dress. A strange man flirts with his wife in a café. The husband challenges the flirting man to a duel which the husband fatally loses. The wife starts to enjoy her widowhood. The story is a black comedy.

Carmen is the tragic story of the soldier Don José falling in love with the Gypsy Carmen. The plot of the ballet roughly follows the story of the opera with some variations in plot detail. The ballet features music by Georges Bizet. In the Lillas Pastia scene, the ballet troupe sings l'amour est enfant de bohème in a half-sung/half-spoken fashion.

== Cast ==
La Croqueuse de diamants

- Zizi Jeanmaire as La Croqueuse de diamants (the Gold Digger)
- Dirk Sanders as Le Jeune Homme (the young man who delivers furniture)
- Bertie Eckhardt as Le Patron du café (the owner of the café)
- Raoul Celada, Gérard Lemaitre, Hans von Manen, Elwin Carel, Claude Jourdan as Les voyous (the hooligans - the gang of pickpockets)

Cyrano de Bergerac

- Moira Shearer as Roxanne
- Roland Petit as Cyrano de Bergerac
- Georges Reich as Christian de Neuvillette
- Josiane Consoli as Lise Ragueneau
- Cecile Zissler as La Duègne (the chaperone)
- Lucien Mars as Le petit marquis
- Leo Lauer as Le mauvais acteur (the bad actor)

Deuil en 24 heures

- Cyd Charisse as L'épouse (the wife who becomes a widow)
- Roland Petit as Le séducteur (the seducer or suiter who flirts with the wife)
- Hans van Manen as Le mari (the husband)
- Gérard Lemaitre as Le garçon de café (the café waiter)
- Danielle Jossi, Regine Rourry as Les soubrettes (the maids)

Carmen

- Zizi Jeanmaire as Carmen
- Roland Petit as Don José
- Josette Clavier as La femme brigand (the woman bandit)
- Henning Kronstam as Le Toréador (the bull fighter)
- Fredbjørn Bjørnsson, Hans von Manen as Les brigands (the bandits)
- Regine Rourry, Sally Pierce, France Arnel, Irena Radkitwiecz as Les cigarières (the cigar makers)

== Reception ==
Black Tights received the Biennale Special Golden Award at the 21st Venice International Film Festival and the European Grand Prix by film critics in Europe.

Reviews at the time of release were largely favorable. Writing in the Los Angeles Times, critic Philip K. Scheuer called the film "artistic without being forbiddingly highbrow" said that 'the film "could do as much to popularize French Ballet as West Side [West Side Story] did for American." He praised the cinematography as "visually dazzling" and said that the Carmen ballet was "the real show-stopper." New York Daily News critic Wanda Hale awarded the film four stars and called it "a most unusual ballet picture, artistic, beautiful, saucy and naughty."

The Boston Globe, while praising Black Tights an "intriguing picture to watch" and "rare entertainment," said that there are "occasional dull spots which slow up its pace and deaden its magic." The Guardian called the film "threadbare" and "very lightly blessed with talent or imagination." The unsigned review described the dancing as "a mixture of modern wiggling and traditional ballet."

The New York Times critic Bosley Crowther said that the "over-all effect of the picture, apart from its meaning for those who are stringent ballet students or lovers and have particularly keen eyes for technique, is that of a great big package of dance numbers from a musical film - just that, ballet numbers. For our personal taste, that's too much." He called the Maurice Chevalier narration "a little foolish and patronizing."

== Legacy ==
In a 1986 review when the film when shown at a revival house, Philadelphia Inquirer critic Carrie Rickey wrote that "whether seen as a significant chapter in the history of modern dance or as a camp curiosity," the film was a "rare record of Petit's Ballet de Paris." She said that Petit had as much influence on Hollywood musicals, especially An American in Paris, as it did on modern dance.

A 1986 New York Times review of the video release of the film noted that Black Tights "had little success upon its release in 1962" but "is now a highly enjoyable record of Mr. Petit's contribution to ballet. And that is his ability to marry popular forms with a poetic realism."

Three dancers who appear in the film—Dirk Sanders, Hans van Manen, and Gerard Lemaitre—went on to form the Netherlands Dance Theater.
