= Anything Goes (soundtrack) =

Songs from the Paramount Picture Anything Goes

Soundtrack album by Bing Crosby
- Released: 1956
- Recorded: 1955
- Genre: Soundtrack, vocal
- Label: Decca

Bing Crosby chronology
A Christmas Sing with Bing Around the World (1956)	Songs from the Paramount Picture Anything Goes (1956)	Songs I Wish I Had Sung the First Time Around (1956)

Anything Goes is a soundtrack album issued by Decca Records (DL 8318) from the film of the same name. (See Anything Goes for the film.) The film starred Bing Crosby, Donald O'Connor, Jeanmaire, and Mitzi Gaynor. Joseph J. Lilley was the musical director with special orchestral arrangements by Van Cleave. All the songs were written by Cole Porter with the exception of three additional songs from Jimmy Van Heusen (music) and Sammy Cahn (lyrics) which have been annotated in the listing below. The soundtrack recording took place between April and June 1955. Three songs were recorded in February 1956 with Joseph J. Lilley and his Orchestra for inclusion in the album to replace the original soundtrack versions.

== Reception ==
The album received a welcome from Variety who said: …there are several plus factors that make it a potent package. Lineup of Porter material, effectively warbled by Bing Crosby in one of his best shellac efforts in some time with assistance from Donald O’Connor, Mitzi Gaynor and Jeanmaire, includes such standards as the title tune, “You’re the Top...”

== Track listing ==
Side one

1. "Ya Gotta Give the People Hoke" 3.15 (Crosby and O'Connor) (Van Heusen / Cahn) – This is from the film soundtrack.
2. "Anything Goes" 3.47 (Gaynor) – The orchestra track is from the film, but Gaynor overdubs a new and different vocal.
3. "I Get a Kick Out of You" 4.03 (Jeanmaire) – This is from the film soundtrack, although the sound quality fluctuates between the vocals and the dance music.
4. "You're the Top" 2.30 (Crosby and Gaynor) – This is a studio recording made on February 23, 1956 with an arrangement totally different from that presented in the film. On screen the number is done as a double duet with Crosby and Gaynor rehearsing in one room while O'Connor and Jeanmaire rehearse in an adjoining room. The recorded version is less complete and has some different lyrics.
5. "Dream Ballet" 7.41 (Orchestra) – This is taken from the soundtrack with the addition "Let's Do It" at the very beginning, which was edited out of the final print of the film.

Side two

1. "It's De-Lovely" 5.49 (O'Connor and Gaynor) – This is from the film soundtrack with dialogue removed.
2. "All Through the Night" 2.58 (Crosby) – This is a studio re-recording made on February 23, 1956 with Crosby singing at a slightly faster tempo.
3. "A Second Hand Turban and a Crystal Ball" 6.10 (Crosby and O'Connor) (Van Heusen / Cahn) – This is the full routine (with a few slight dialogue abridgments) taken from the film soundtrack.
4. "You Can Bounce Right Back" 4.08 (O'Connor) (Van Heusen / Cahn) – This is from the film soundtrack.
5. "Blow, Gabriel, Blow" 4.49 (Full cast) – This is from the soundtrack, but remixed to remove the chorus and adding some verses not heard in the finished film.

The album stayed in Decca's catalog until 1969 when it was discontinued. In 2004, Decca Broadway re-released the recording on CD with three additional Crosby songs which had been used the 1936 film of Anything Goes: "Sailor Beware", "My Heart and I", and "Moonburn".
