= Lycette Darsonval =

French dancer

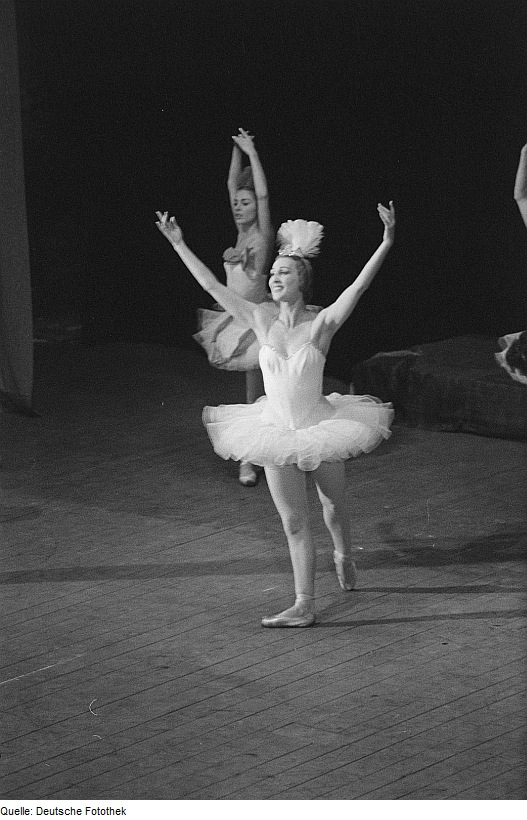
"Die romantische Ballett" (Paris Opera); Leipzig

Lycette Darsonval (born Alice Andrée Marie Perron, 12 February 1912 – 1 November 1996) was a French ballet dancer.

She visited Noël Corbu in Rennes-le-Château with the artist Jean Raffy Le Persan (1920–2008) during the 1950s.

== Biography ==
Lycette Darsonval is the half-sister of dancer Serge Perrault. Dancer in the street in Montmartre, she was spotted and entered the Paris Opera at the age of 23, where, a pupil of Nicola Guerra, she became one of the most prominent performers of the "Lifar generation", promoted to the rank as a prima ballerina in 1940. The title of star not being official until 1941, Solange Schwarz and Lycette Darsonval were the first dancers to bear this title.

Two bronzes by Jacques Gestalder representing Lycette Darsonval are exhibited at the Bettencourt-Schueller foundation in Neuilly-sur-Seine.

A portrait of Lycette Darsonval was painted by Serge Ivanoff.

== Bibliography ==
- Martine Cadieu, Lycette Darsonval, Paris, Presses littéraires de France, collection "Danseurs et danseuses", 1951, 19 p. (notice BnF no FRBNF31896532)
- Lycette Darsonval, Ma vie sur les pointes, Ed. France-Empire, 1988
- Louis Léon-Martin, Les demoiselles d'Opéra, Éditions des portiques, 1930
- Serge Lifar, Les mémoires d'Icare, Sauret, 1993
- Florence Poudru, Serge Lifar: la danse pour patrie, Hermann, 2007
- Gilbert Serres, Coulisses de la danse, France-Europe Ed., 2005
