= Songs I Wish I Had Sung the First Time Around =

Studio album by Bing Crosby
- Released: 1956
- Recorded: April 17–18, 1956
- Genre: Vocal
- Length: 36:04
- Label: Decca
- Producer: Jack Pleis

Bing Crosby chronology
Anything Goes (1956)	Songs I Wish I Had Sung the First Time Around (1956)	Bing Sings Whilst Bregman Swings (1956)

Songs I Wish I Had Sung the First Time Around is the eighteenth solo studio album by American singer and actor Bing Crosby. It was Crosby’s fourth album for Decca and his fifth LP, recorded and originally released in 1956 on vinyl as Decca DL 8352.

This was a concept album of sorts, as Bing covered some of his musical rivals' big hits, such as Al Jolson's "April Showers" and Nat King Cole's "Mona Lisa". The jazz historian Will Friedwald wrote that the album "was essentially Crosby's way of acknowledging that he wasn't the only male singer to create hits and standards".

Crosby recorded the songs in April 1956 in Los Angeles, with orchestrations by arranger Jack Pleis. Longtime record producer Milt Gabler came up with the concept.

All 12 tracks from Songs I Wish I Had Sung were released by Sepia Records on the 2011 CD Through the Years: Volume Nine (1955). Bing Crosby Enterprises and Universal Music issued a deluxe, 22-track version of Songs I Wish I Had Sung in 2014 which added many radio tracks to the original LP.

== Reception ==
Billboard reviewed the album, saying: "A fine, relaxed collection of a dozen old standards projected in the standard Crosby idiom. All of them are great songs which have been closely identified with – in fact, almost the personal property of great names in the business – 'April Showers,' 'Blue Heaven,' 'Thanks for the Memory,' 'Ain’t Misbehavin',' etc. Crosby gives them a personalized treatment for sure-fire deejay programming material."

== Personnel ==
All personnel as listed on the Bing Crosby Enterprises and Universal Music deluxe, 22-track CD version:

Buddy Cole (piano); Vince Terri (guitar); Don Whitaker (bass); Nick Fatool (drums); Skeets Herfurt, Harry Klee, Ted Nash (alto saxophones); Jules Jacob (tenor saxophone); Robert Lawson (baritone saxophone); Lou Raderman, Henry Hill, Ben Gill, Victor Arno, Toscha Seidel, Sam Cytron, Saul Steinberg, Nick Pisani, Jack Pepper (violins); Abe Hochstein, Milt Thomas, Raymond Menhennick (violas); Armand Koproff, Ossip Giskin (cellos).

== Track listing ==
Side one
No.	Title	Writer(s)	Length
1.	"April Showers" (with Jud Conlon's Rhythmaires)	Louis Silvers, B. G. De Sylva	2:48
2.	"When My Baby Smiles at Me"	Bill Munro, Andrew B. Sterling, Ted Lewis	3:11
3.	"My Blue Heaven" (with Jud Conlon's Rhythmaires)	Walter Donaldson, George A. Whiting	2:44
4.	"A Little Kiss Each Morning"	Harry M. Woods	2:57
5.	"Prisoner of Love"	Russ Columbo, Clarence Gaskill, Leo Robin	3:20
6.	"Ain't Misbehavin'"	Andy Razaf, Thomas Waller, Harry Brooks	2:54
Total length:			17:54

Side two
No.	Title	Writer(s)	Length
1.	"Paper Doll" (with Jud Conlon's Rhythmaires)	Johnny S. Black	3:01
2.	"This Love of Mine"	Sol Parker, Frank Sinatra, Hank Sanicola	2:50
3.	"Thanks for the Memory"	Ralph Rainger, Leo Robin	3:04
4.	"Blues in the Night" (with Jud Conlon's Rhythmaires)	Harold Arlen, Johnny Mercer	3:13
5.	"Mona Lisa"	Ray Evans, Jay Livingston	3:03
6.	"Memories Are Made of This"	Terry Gilkyson, Richard Dehr, Frank Miller	3:00
Total length:			18:11
