= The Lady in the Ice =

- Choreographer: Roland Petit
- Music: Jean-Michel Damase
- Based on: an idea by Orson Welles
- Premiere: September 7, 1953; Stoll Theatre, London
- Original ballet company: Ballet de Paris

The Lady in the Ice is a 1953 ballet composed by Jean-Michel Damase, choreographed by Roland Petit, and directed by Orson Welles, based on an idea by Welles. Welles also wrote the libretto and was the ballet's costume and set designer. Richard Negri was the assistant designer. It was Welles's only attempt at a ballet.

The ballet was staged by the Ballet de Paris, premiering on 7 September 1953 at the Stoll Theatre in London. The cast included Colette Marchand, Georges Reich, and Joe Milan. Later in 1953 the ballet was produced by Petit in Paris, as Une femme dans la glace. Welles discussed the production with Peter Bogdanovich in the book This Is Orson Welles:

It was very successful in London, and only moderately so in Paris, where it was very badly lit — as everything always is in Paris. The plot is: a girl's been found, like dinosaurs have been found, in a block of ice. And she's on display in a sort of carnival. A young man falls in love with her, and his love melts the ice. And when she kisses him, he turns to ice. A little parable for our times.
