= The Glass Slipper (film) =

1955 film by Charles Walters

- Original film poster
- Directed by: Charles Walters
- Written by: Helen Deutsch
- Based on: Cendrillon ou la petite pantoufle de verre 1697 fairy tale by Charles Perrault
- Produced by: Edwin H. Knopf
- Starring: Leslie Caron; Michael Wilding; Keenan Wynn; Estelle Winwood; Elsa Lanchester
- Cinematography: Arthur E. Arling
- Edited by: Ferris Webster
- Music by: Bronislau Kaper
- Color process: Eastmancolor
- Production company: Metro-Goldwyn-Mayer
- Distributed by: Loew's Inc.
- Release date: March 24, 1955 (U.S.)
- Running time: 93 minutes
- Country: United States
- Language: English
- Budget: $1,998,000
- Box office: $2,952,000

The Glass Slipper (1955) is an American musical film adaptation of the fairy tale Cinderella, made by MGM, directed by Charles Walters and produced by Edwin H. Knopf from a screenplay by Helen Deutsch. The music score is by Bronislau Kaper, the cinematography by Arthur E. Arling, the art direction by Daniel B. Cathcart and Cedric Gibbons and costume design by Walter Plunkett and Helen Rose.

The film stars Leslie Caron as Cinderella, and Michael Wilding as the Prince, with Keenan Wynn, Estelle Winwood, Elsa Lanchester, Barry Jones, Lurene Tuttle, Liliane Montevecchi and Walter Pidgeon as the Narrator.

The film received its network television premiere divided into two episodes on the 1967 ABC-TV anthology series Off to See the Wizard.

== Plot ==
Ella is a lonely and misunderstood young woman living in a European duchy. She works as a lowly servant to her stepmother, the Widow Sonder, and stepsisters, Birdena and Serafina. Ella is shunned by the townspeople because of her anti-social behavior and nicknamed "Cinderella." In the face of ridicule, Ella boasts that she will live in the palace one day, as a fortune-teller once told her late mother.

Prince Charles, son of the Duke who rules the principality, has been studying abroad for years; his return being celebrated by three days of festivities and a ball on the final day. He starts to recall old memories he had of growing up there, including a small girl with unbearably sad eyes whom he saw when he was just a boy.

After getting into a spat with her stepfamily, Ella runs away to her favorite place, a small secluded pool on the Palace grounds. There she meets the eccentric town vagrant, Mrs. Toquet, who becomes her first friend.

The next day she returns to the spot, hoping to meet Mrs. Toquet, but instead finds Charles and his friend Kovin. Ella asks them where they are from and they tell her that they come from the Palace and that Charles is the son of the Chief Cook. Charles then recognizes Ella's eyes as those belonging to the girl he saw years ago. Ella thinks that he is making fun of her and pushes him into the pool.

The Sonder home is visited by their wealthy Cousin Loulou. Ella is supposed to be cleaned up to receive their guest, but her stepfamily is scandalized when they discover that she is barefoot. Ella remembers that she left her shoes at the pond and runs off to collect them, where she finds Charles waiting for her. Ella apologizes for pushing him into the water and he apologizes for hurting her feelings. Charles gives her an invitation to the Ball and a quick dancing lesson. After a waltz Charles steals a kiss and Ella runs away.

After the Widow Sonder, Birdena, and Serafina leave for the ball, Mrs. Toquet arrives, bringing a pair of glass slippers and one of Cousin Loulou's fancy ballgowns, claiming she has "borrowed" it for Ella's use. She has also arranged for a coach to take Ella to the palace and warns her to leave by midnight so as not to inconvenience the coachman's other clients.

At the Ball, Ella is besieged by young men wanting to dance with her, but she refuses to speak to anyone, trying to reach the Palace kitchens to find Charles. Kovin recognizes Ella and informs Charles, who then waltzes with her and reveals his true identity. The other guests note the unknown newcomer's exotic appearance and surmise (because of her short hair) that she is an Egyptian princess. As the clock strikes midnight, Ella runs off to escape her suspicious stepfamily. Running through the palace garden she stumbles leaving one of her glass slippers behind. The slipper is then picked up by Charles. Ella's coach overturns and she is knocked unconscious; lying next to her on the ground are a pumpkin and several mice. Ella wakes up back home and is greeted by Mrs. Toquet, who informs Ella that everything she borrowed is back where it belongs.

Prince Charles informs his father that he has met the woman he wants to marry. Kovin, picking up on what he's overheard at the ball, hurriedly "explains" that Ella is an Egyptian princess. By the next morning, everyone has heard that the Prince has chosen an Egyptian Princess to be his bride. When Ella hears this news, she is devastated and decides to run away, first stopping at her favorite place to see Mrs. Toquet, to whom she bids farewell. Ella throws herself on the ground sobbing, until she looks up and sees the Prince, holding her lost glass slipper, which he declares will fit only the foot of the princess he intends to marry. A crowd of gatherers, including Ella's stepmother and stepsisters, bow to Ella as she and the Prince ride off to the palace together. Mrs. Toquet, revealed to be Ella's fairy godmother, vanishes, returning from whence she came.

== Cast ==
- Leslie Caron as Ella/Cinderella
- Michael Wilding as Prince Charles
- Elsa Lanchester as the Widow Sonder, Ella's stepmother
- Amanda Blake as Birdena, Ella's stepsister
- Lisa Daniels as Serafina, Ella's stepsister
- Barry Jones as The Duke, Prince Charles' father
- Estelle Winwood as Mrs. Toquet, Ella's fairy godmother
- Keenan Wynn as Kovin
- Lurene Tuttle as Cousin Loulou
- Liliane Montevecchi as Princess Tehara
- Georges Reich as Dancer
- Violette Verdy as Ballerina in Giant Cake Scene

== Production ==
Eleanor and Herbert Farjeon had written a 1944 play about Cinderella, The Glass Slipper. MGM bought the film rights in 1953 as a vehicle for Leslie Caron.

Caron had just had a big hit at the studio in Lili, so MGM reunited her with that film's producer and director for Glass Slipper. Anatole de Grunwald was assigned to write the script. However eventually script duties went to Helen Deutsch, who wrote Lilli.

The Farjeons are not credited on the final film. Deutsch claimed her script was basically an original work:

MGM gave me one word, 'Cinderella'. That's how it started. I read practically everything written about this famous waif, rejection most conceptions of the character. Actually my Cinderella of the 18th century is not based definitely on anyone's ideas but my own. Waifs have intrigued the reading public for generations; they were popular characters in the early movies - the Gish era - then gave way to more worldly females. I first revived the waif successfully in Lili.

Lili had a hit song "Hi Lili Hi Lo", lyrics by Helen Deutsch; the same team wrote one for Glass Slipper, "Take My Love". Deutsch also wrote the libretto for the ballet scenes.

The male lead was given to Michael Wilding, who was then married to MGM contract star Elizabeth Taylor and was under contract to the studio himself.

Taina Elg was to have made her dramatic debut in the film but in the end MGM decided to only use her as a dancer. Eventually it was decided that Elg would debut in The Prodigal and not appear in Glass Slipper at all. She was replaced by Liliane Montevecchi. The Ballet de Paris appeared in some scenes.

Keenan Wynn was withdrawn from Deep in My Heart to appear in the film.

== Music ==
The score was composed by Bronislau Kaper and conducted by Miklós Rózsa, with orchestrations by Robert Franklyn. Additional recording sessions were conducted by Johnny Green. Helen Deutsch wrote lyrics for the song "Take My Love" to music by Kaper. Vocals for actor Michael Wilding were performed by Gilbert Russell.

The complete score, including alternate versions of the three ballets by Kaper, was released in 2005 on compact disc on the Film Score Monthly label.

The choreography was by Roland Petit.

== Reception ==
According to MGM records the film earned $1,363,000 in the US and Canada and $1,589,000 elsewhere, resulting in a loss of $387,000.

== See also ==
- List of American films of 1955
