= Governor Nelson State Park =

State park in Dane County, Wisconsin

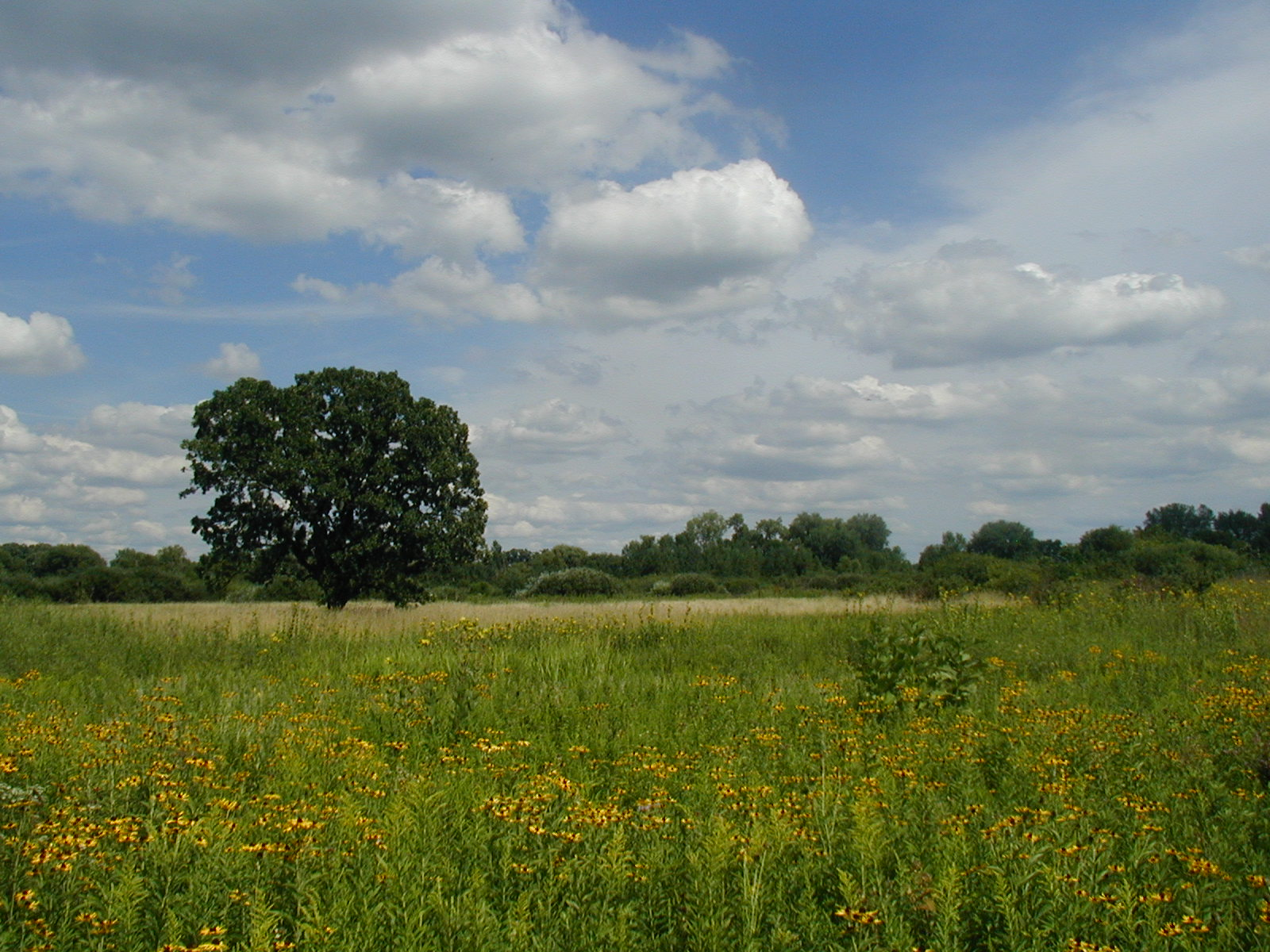
- Summer meadow

- Location within Wisconsin Location within the United States
- Interactive map of Governor Nelson State Park
- Location: Dane County, Wisconsin, United States
- Coordinates: 43°8′6″N 89°26′11″W
- Area: 422 acres (171 ha)
- Elevation: 850 ft (260 m)
- Established: 1975
- Administrator: Wisconsin Department of Natural Resources
- Named for: Gaylord Nelson
- Website: Official website
- Wisconsin State Parks

Governor Nelson State Park is a 422-acre (171 ha) Wisconsin state park located outside of Waunakee, Wisconsin in the town of Westport on the north shore of Lake Mendota. It is named for former Wisconsin Governor Gaylord Nelson. On most days the Wisconsin State Capitol building can be seen in nearby Madison. Common activities include boating, fishing, picnicking and swimming. There is also a boat launch and a swimming area for pets. Away from the lake one can find restored prairie and savanna, effigy mounds, hiking trails and ski trails.

== History ==
A portion of the site of the park originally hosted a boys' camp called Camp Indianola. Orson Welles was a camper at the camp in his youth. The camp closed in 1967.

== Gallery ==
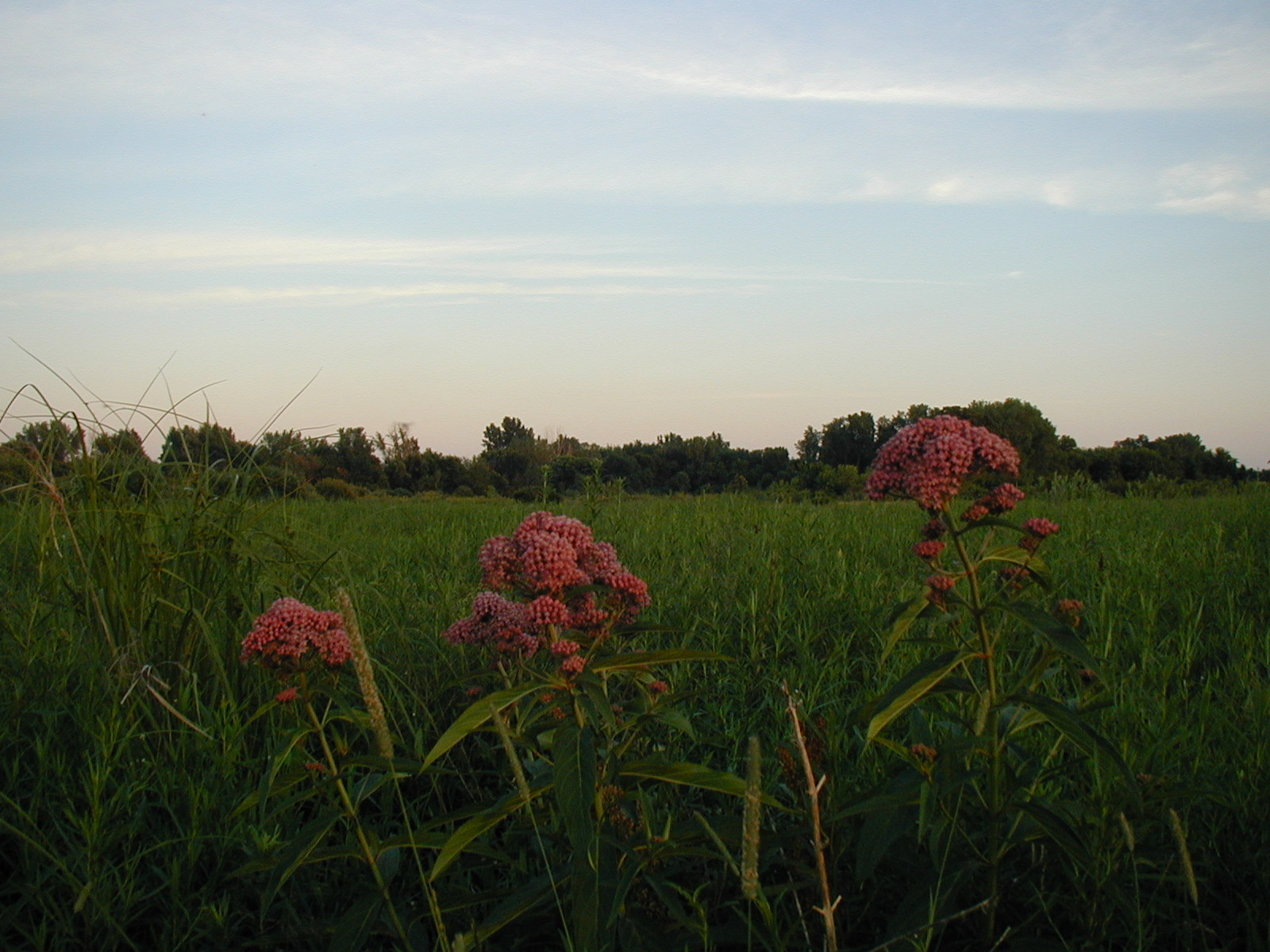
Wildflower view

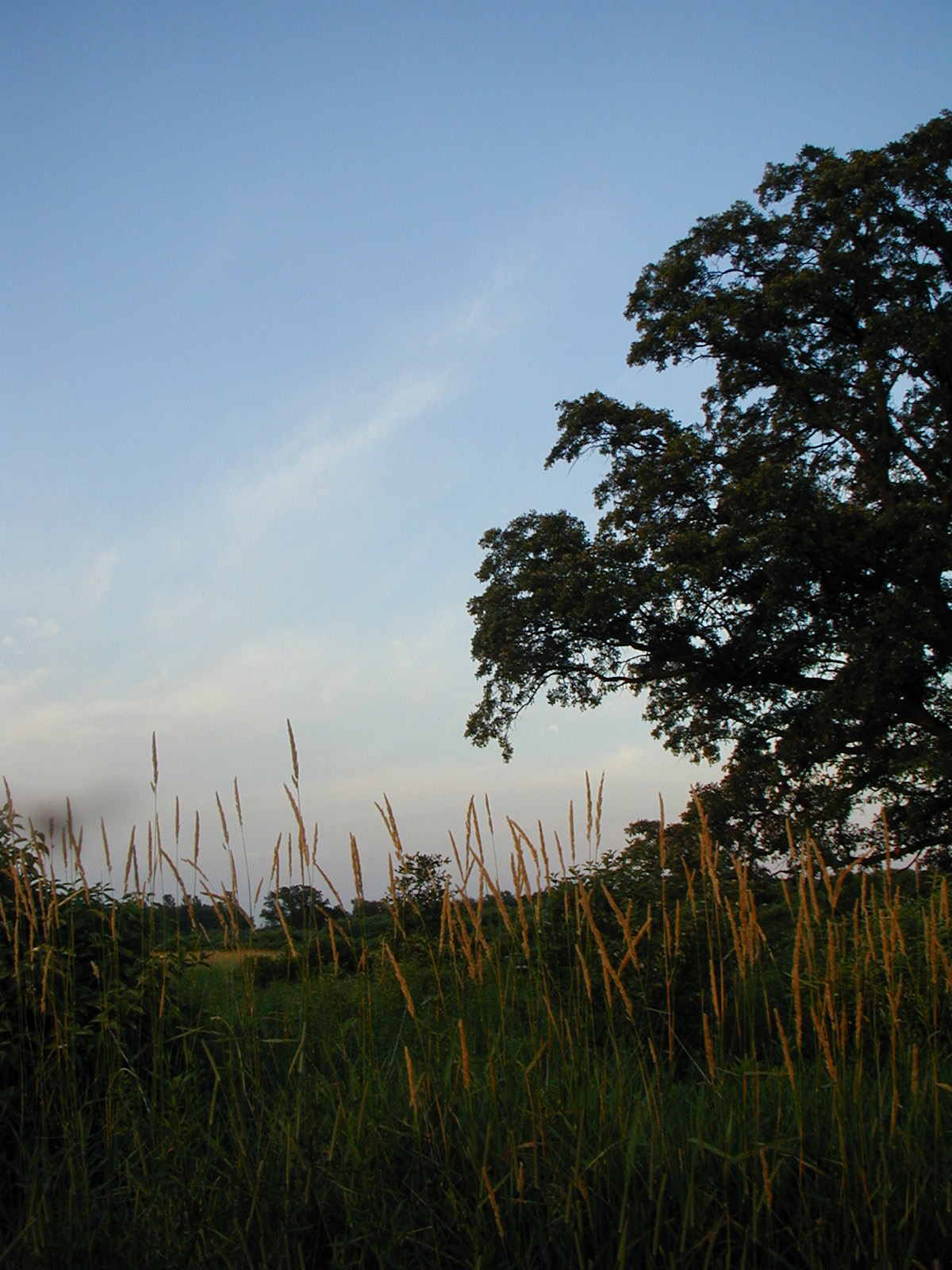
Lone prairie oak

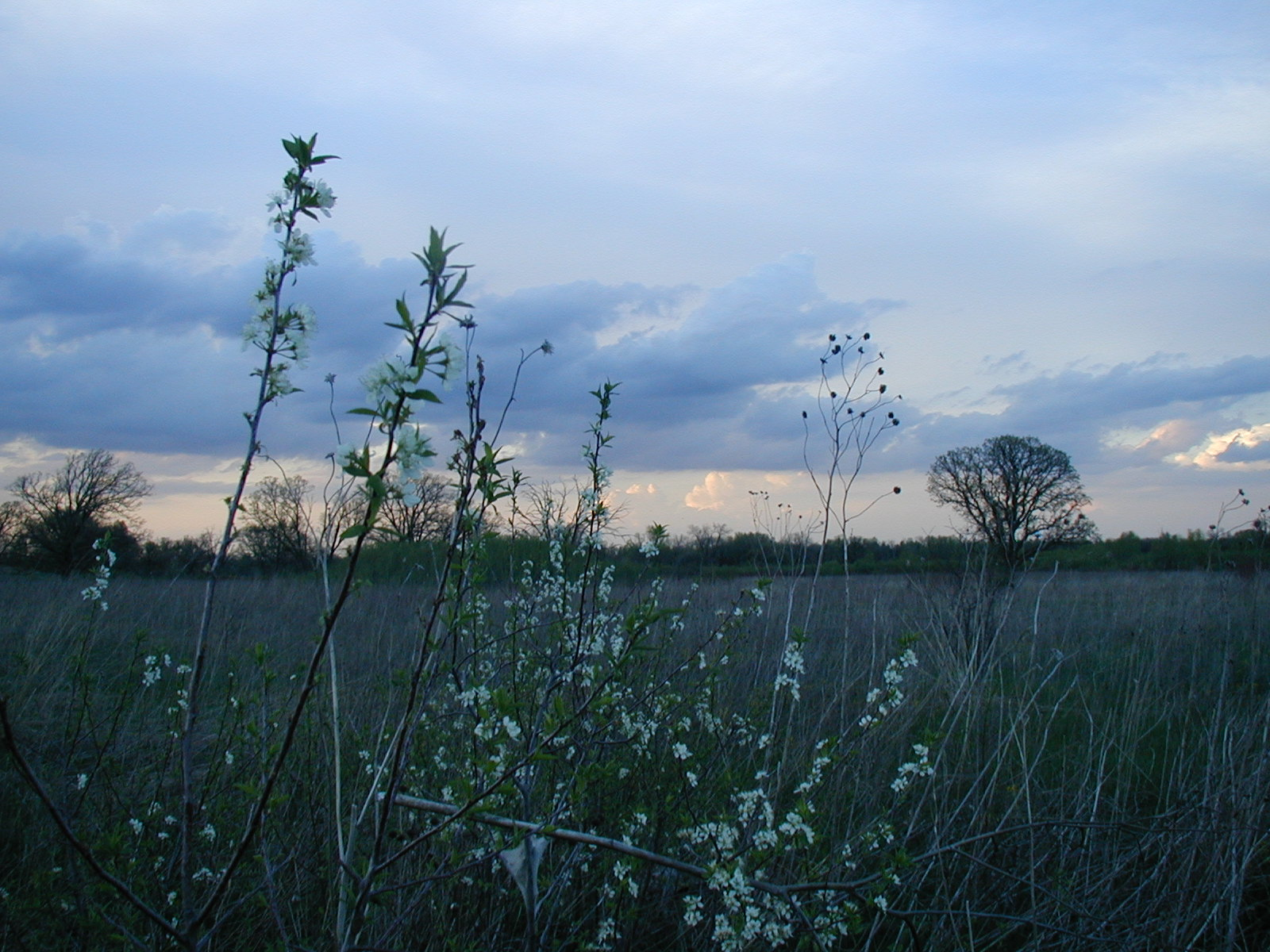
Early blooms on the prairie

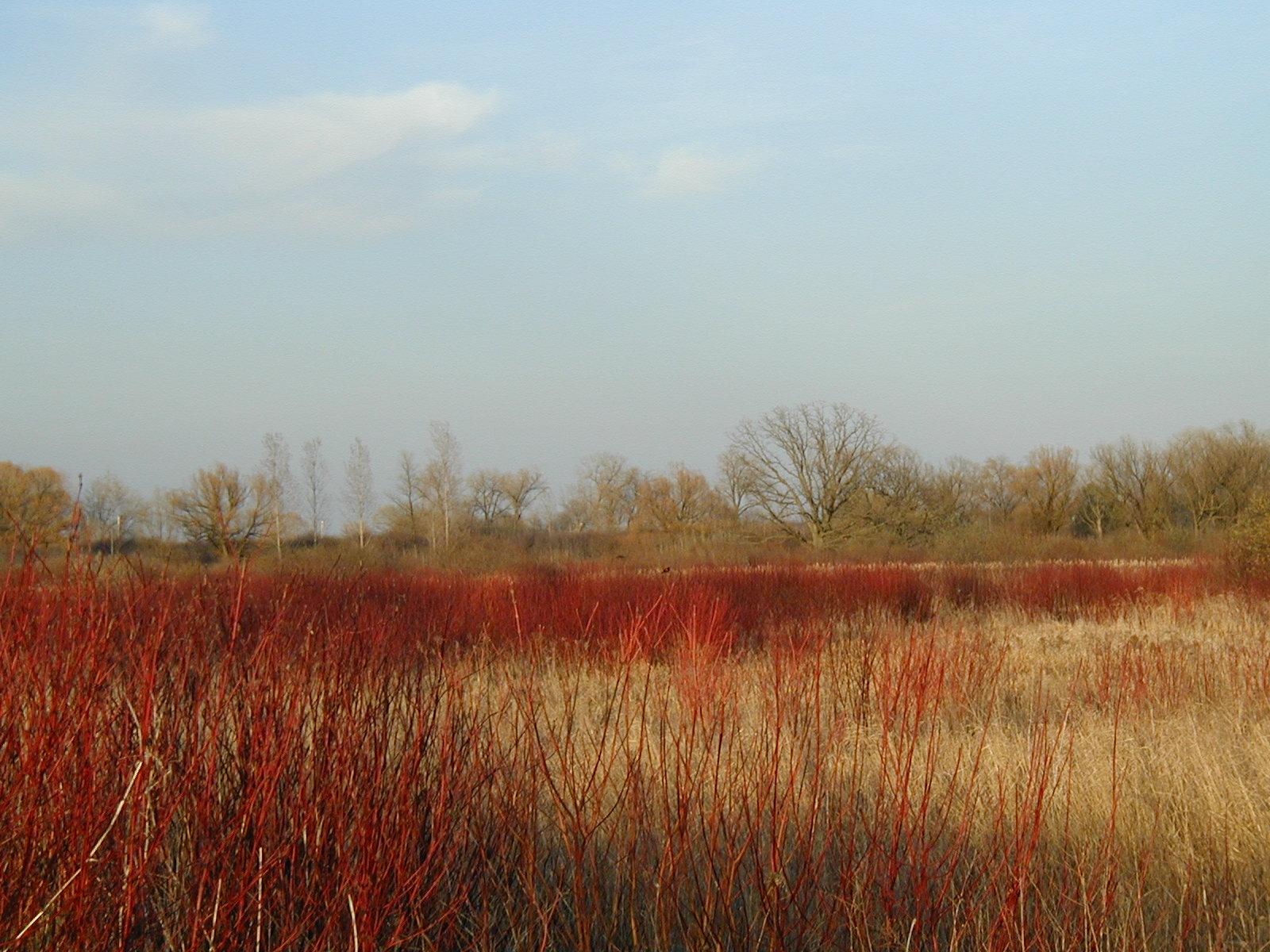
Early spring in the marsh

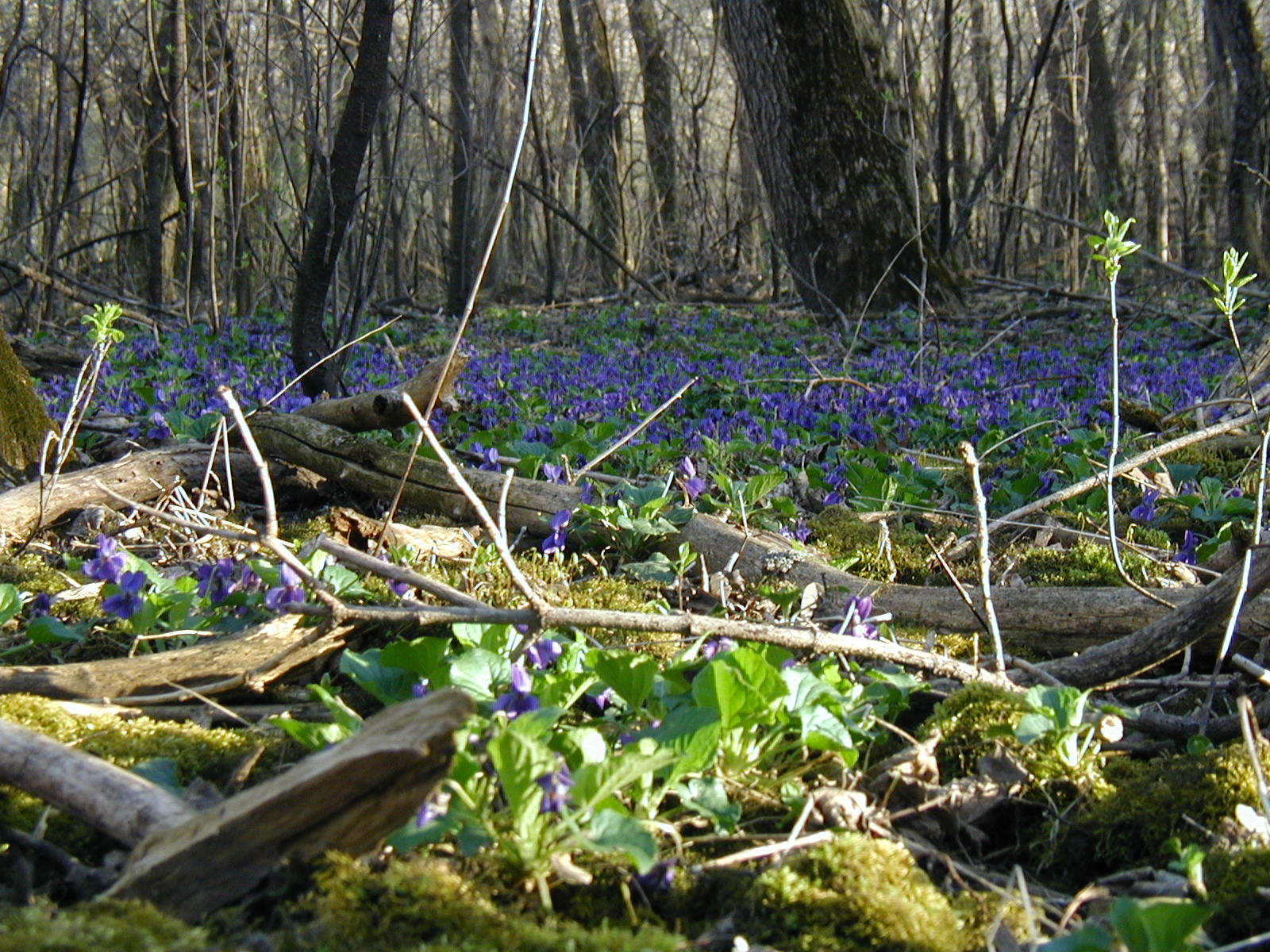
Spring forest bloom
