= Georges Reich =

American choreographer (1926–2013)

- Born: Georges Frank Reich; 15 December 1926; Patchogue, Long Island, New York, U.S.
- Died: 4 May 2013 (aged 86); Dallas, Texas, U.S.
- Other name: George F. Reich
- Education: Ballet Markova Dolin Company
- Occupations: Actor; Dancer; Choreographer; Composer
- Years active: 1948–1970
- Partner: Jean Marais (1948–1959)

George Frank Reich (December 15, 1926 – May 4, 2013), known professionally as Georges Reich, was an American dancer, choreographer, actor, and director who significantly influenced mid-century French cabaret and introduced American modern jazz dance to Europe during the 1950s and 1960s. He was in a romantic relationship with French actor Jean Marais.

== Early life ==
He was born in Patchogue, Long Island, New York, Reich trained with the Ballet Markova Dolin Company and appeared on Broadway in Inside U.S.A. (1948) and Touch and Go (1949).

== Career ==
=== Acting ===
Reich transitioned into cinema in the 1950s. He was offered a seven year contract to stay with MGM Studios. Despite receiving an MGM contract offer following The Glass Slipper (1955), he refused and returned to France.

=== Dance career in France (1950s–1960s) ===
He moved to Paris in the early 1950s for an engagement at the Lido de Paris, he began an 18-year career in France. In 1955, he formed his own ensemble, Le Ballet HO de George Reich, blending American jazz and Broadway styles into French music hall acts.

He danced at the Moulin Rouge, the Olympia Music Hall, and the Ballet de Paris. He was the first male principal at the Lido to wear a mirrored G-string, a costume designed for a routine choreographed by Gwen Verdon.

He appeared in French film roles such as School for Love (1955) and Black Tights (1961). He staged productions for major stars including Josephine Baker, Marlene Dietrich, Édith Piaf, Brigitte Bardot, and Line Renaud.

=== Later career in America ===
In the 1970s, he returned to the U.S. and became a key creative director for Carnival Cruise Line's large-scale stage revues.

== Personal life ==
Reich was in a romantic relationship with French actor Jean Marais from 1948 to 1959. The pair were known for their striking physical resemblance—both were athletic and blonde—and lived together on a péniche (houseboat) named L'Apprenti fakir on the Seine. Marais, an accomplished artist, used Reich as a frequent subject for his paintings and sculptures.

== Death ==
He died in Dallas, Texas, in 2013.

== Filmography ==
=== Television ===
Year	Title	Role	Notes
1949	Admiral Broadway Revue	Frank James	Episode: Sing in a New Day
1950	The Saturday Night Revue with Jack Carter	Dancer	S1. Episode: 7

=== Film ===
Year	Title	Role	Notes
1955	Daddy Long Legs	Specialty Dancer	
1955	The Glass Slipper	Dancer	
1955	School for Love	Dick Killian	
1956	Les Lumières Du Soir	Steve Crown	
1956	Cette Sacrée Gamine	Dancer	Choreographer
1956	Bonsoir Paris	Le maître de ballets	
1957	La Garçonne	Peer-Rys	
1959	Julie La Rousse	Dancer	Choreographer
1961	Black Tights	Christian de Neuvillette	
1962	Taras Bulba, the Cossack	Ostapi	
1962	Indiscrétion	Dancer	Director
1970	Cover Me Babe	Composer	Lyrics
