= Zizi Jeanmaire =

French ballet dancer and singer (1924–2020)

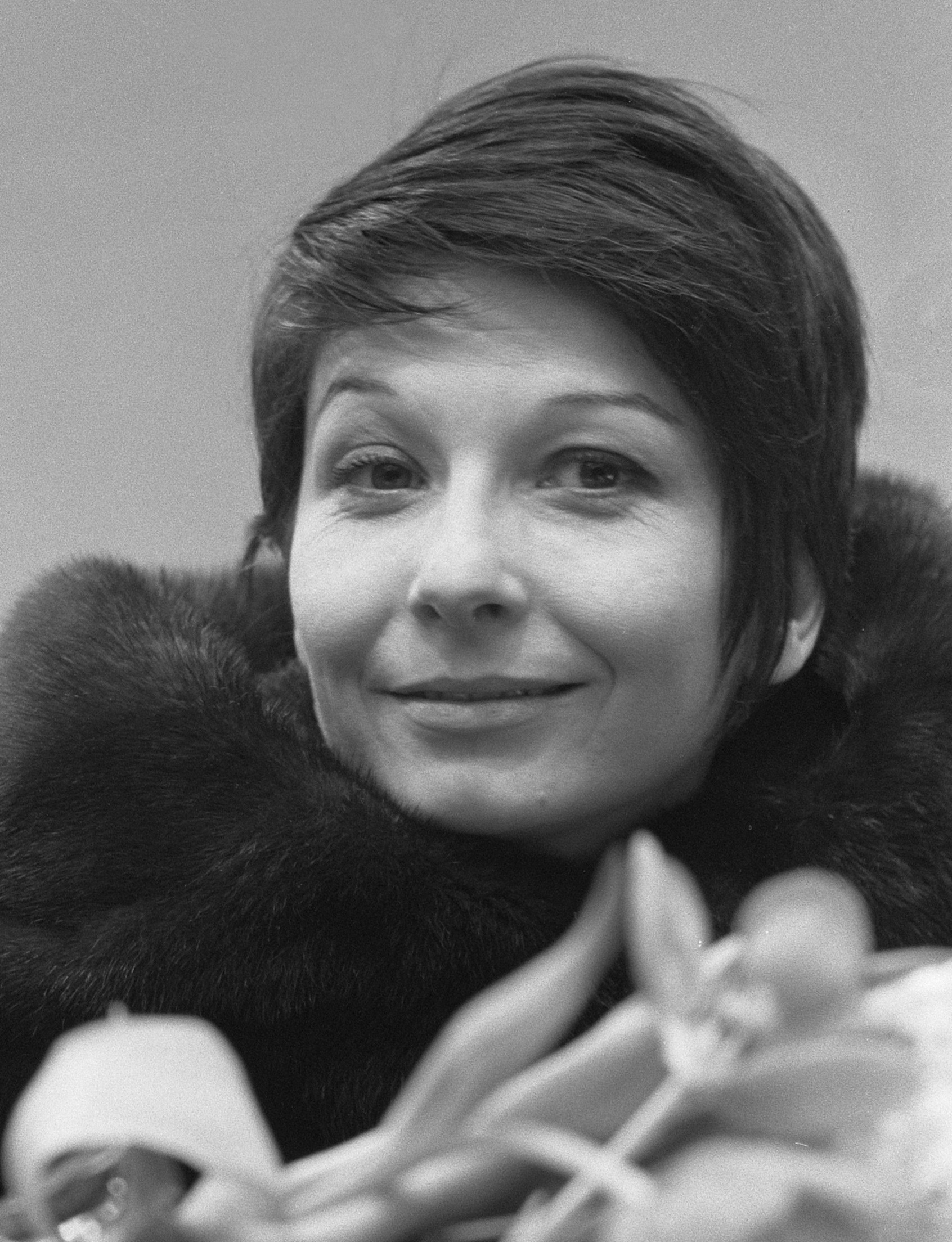
- Jeanmaire in 1963
- Born: Renée Marcelle Jeanmaire; 29 April 1924; Paris, France
- Died: 17 July 2020 (aged 96); Tolochenaz, Vaud, Switzerland
- Occupations: Dancer, actress, singer
- Years active: 1943–1982
- Spouse: Roland Petit (m. 1954; died 2011)
- Children: 1

Renée Marcelle "Zizi" Jeanmaire (29 April 1924 – 17 July 2020) was a French ballet dancer, actress and singer. She became famous in the 1950s after playing the title role in the ballet Carmen, produced in London in 1949, and went on to appear in several Hollywood films and Paris revues. She was the wife of dancer and choreographer Roland Petit, who created ballets and revues for her.

== Career ==
Jeanmaire was born in Paris to Olga Renée (née Brunus) and Marcel Jeanmaire. She later wrote in her autobiography: "When I was little my mother called me 'mon Jésus' which transformed into 'mon Zizi'."

She met her future husband and long-time collaborator Roland Petit at the Paris Opera Ballet when they were both aged nine. She danced in 1944 in the Soirées de la danse at the Theater Sarah Bernhardt. She became a ballerina of the Nouveau Ballet de Monte Carlo in 1946, and danced during the last season of Colonel de Basil's Ballets Russes de Monte Carlo in London in 1947. In 1949, she became the star of the Ballets de Paris directed by Petit, where she was known for her energy and passion. She created her most famous role, Carmen, to a musical arrangement of Bizet's opera. For the role, she had her hair cut to boyish shortness, which was copied by many women. The ballet was premiered in London at the Prince's Theatre on 21 February 1949, and the obituary in The Guardian noted: "Nothing as sensual as the duets that Petit created for the lovers had been seen on the London stage before." The performance was taken to an extended tour on Broadway, repeated the following season.

Jeanmaire first appeared as a chanson singer in Petit's Croqueuse de Diamants in 1950. A chanson, composed by Raymond Cheneau, won a Grand Prix du disque. In Hollywood, she appeared in the musical film Hans Christian Andersen in 1952, with Danny Kaye and Farley Granger. In 1954, she starred on Broadway again, in the musical The Girl in Pink Tights. She returned to Paris and married Petit that year. Their daughter Valentine was born the following year, and would become a dancer and actress.

Jeanmaire appeared in film again in 1956, in Cole Porter's Anything Goes with Bing Crosby, but otherwise focused on dance, including Petit's La Rose des vents in 1958 and Cyrano de Bergerac in 1959. Beginning in 1961, she made a career in revues at the Alhambra Theatre, with hits such as "Mon truc en plumes". She performed the song in a dress by Yves Saint Laurent, who became her chief designer for stage and private clothes, and a friend. The number, with twelve young men carrying pink feather fans, became a signature tune and was repeated in other revues by Petit, who produced more than 60 shows with her.

Her fame garnered her press attention, and she preferred seating at fashion shows, for example in a Yves Saint Laurent show in 1967, next to Elsa Martinelli, Françoise Hardy and Catherine Deneuve. Almost 50 years later, Vogue magazine viewed Jeanmaire and her peers as representing a guidepost of fashion week celebrity culture.

Jeanmaire died in Switzerland on 17 July 2020.

== Cultural references ==
Jeanmaire is mentioned in the lyrics of the song by Peter Sarstedt, "Where Do You Go To (My Lovely)?": "You talk like Marlene Dietrich, and you dance like Zizi Jeanmaire". She is also mentioned in the Steve Harley song "Nothing Is Sacred" which contains the lyrics, "Zizi Jeanmaire wouldn't take this and neither will we".

== Filmography ==
- Hans Christian Andersen (1952) as Doro
- Anything Goes (1956) as Gaby Duval
- Folies-Bergère (1957) as Claudie
- Charming Boys (1957) as Lulu Natier
- Guinguette (1959) as Renée dit 'Guinguette'
- Black Tights (1961) as The Gold Digger / Carmen

== Bibliography ==
- Zizi. Zizi Jeanmaire with Gérard Mannoni (2002), Paris: Assouline, 2002, 147 pages (French); ISBN 2-84323-389-5
