= Carmen (1949 ballet) =

1949 ballet

- Choreographer: Roland Petit
- Based on: Carmen (novella)
- Premiere: 21 February 1949; Shaftesbury Theatre, London
- Original ballet company: Les Ballets de Paris
- Design: Antoni Clavé

Carmen is a ballet created by Roland Petit and his company 'Les Ballets de Paris' at the Prince's Theatre in London on 21 February 1949, which has entered the repertory of ballet companies in France and around the world.

== Background ==
This ballet is in five scenes and represents a striking admixture of classical ballet, Spanish-style movement, mime, and freshly invented dramatic dance action. It opened "scandalously and brilliantly, with the fabulously sexy Zizi Jeanmaire in the title role" in London and has been regularly performed ever since. The original designs and costumes were by Antoni Clavé. The music is taken from the 1875 opera of the same name by Georges Bizet, arranged and re-orchestrated by Tommy Desserre. The scenario is based on the 1845 novella by Prosper Mérimée. The principal roles were created for Petit's wife-to-be Zizi Jeanmaire (Carmen), Roland Petit (Don José) and Serge Perrault (Le Toréador). Over 5,000 performances of the work were given around the world over its first 50 years, and is considered to be the most frequently performed of ballets based on Bizet's opera.

== Original cast ==
- Zizi Jeanmaire, Carmen
- Roland Petit, Don José
- Serge Perrault, Le Toréador
- Belinda Wright, Woman Bandit
- Nina Bibikova, Cigarette Girl
- Ursula Kubler, Cigarette Girl
- Mireille Lefebvre, Cigarette Girl
- Stanley Hall, Bandit
- Gordon Hamilton, Chief Bandit
- Gabriel Houbard, Bandit
- Gregor Mondjian, Bandit
- Joy Williams, Cigarette Girl

== Synopsis ==
The first scene is set in a street in Seville (Sevilla), Spain, where the dancing of a crowd is interrupted by a girl being chased by Carmen. Their fight is only stopped by the arrival of Don José, who assists Carmen's defeated opponent. As he is about to arrest Carmen he is struck by her allure and arranges an assignation for later. That evening in the tavern Don José enters and dances a zapateado to the music of the habanera. Carmen next appears and dances, ending at Don José's feet; he lifts her up and they go up to the bedroom. The customers dance and when Carmen and Don José return they join in before José wraps Carmen in his cape and they go off.

The third scene is in Carmen's bedroom. After a passionate pas de deux, three of Carmen's friends come in and invite her to go outside. At night in the street, Carmen, Don José and the friends prepare to rob a passer-by. Using a dagger Carmen has given him, Don José stabs a man, and after the women have taken his purse, they all flee.

The final scene is set outside the bull-ring where girls await the arrival of their hero, the toreador. He enters and greets them but is fascinated by the indifference shown by Carmen. José enters and notices their looks. The toreador moves into the arena whereupon Don José threatens Carmen, and in a fight to the death he overcomes her. As she dies, hats are tossed from the bull-ring to land at his feet.

== Recordings ==
Of performances captured on film, two feature the title role creator Zizi Jeanmaire; in one version from 1960 Don José is danced by Roland Petit and another (from 1980) has Mikhail Baryshnikov in that role. A Paris recording from 2005 features Clairemarie Osta and Nicolas Le Riche.
