= Nick Castle (dance director) =

American choreographer/dance director (1910–1968)

Nick Castle (1910–1968; born Nicholas John Casaccio (Note: Some sources give his birth name as Nicola John Casaccio.)) was an American choreographer and dance director of television and film.

Castle was born in Brooklyn, New York, on March 21, 1910, to an Italian-American family. He danced in vaudeville numbers before moving to Los Angeles in 1935.

There, Castle became "[o]ne of Hollywood's most important and prolific tap dancers, choreographers, producers, and teachers" and "worked with all the major musical stars". His credits include Hellzapoppin' and Stormy Weather.

Mr. Castle made an uncredited TV appearance on Laugh-In, season 2 episode 2, as dancer "Tippy Toe Tom", which aired September 23, 1968. This was most likely his last public performance. After the end of his second segment, Rowan and Martin did a brief, subtle, but moving tribute to him.

Castle changed his surname from Casaccio to Castle upon learning that Casaccio meant "dilapidated house" in Italian. He was married to Milly Granata Castle; they had two children. His son, Nick Castle, is a film director and screenwriter.

Castle died of a heart attack August 28, 1968, in Los Angeles. He was 58 years old. He is buried in Holy Cross Cemetery in Culver City, California.
