= Roland Petit =

French ballet dancer and choreographer (1924–2011)

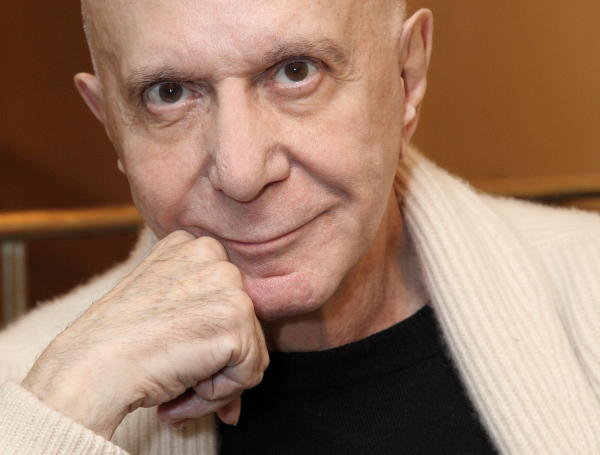
- Petit in 2009
- Born: 13 January 1924; Villemomble, France
- Died: 10 July 2011 (aged 87); Geneva, Switzerland
- Citizenship: France; United States
- Education: Paris Opéra Ballet
- Occupations: Dancer and choreographer
- Years active: 1940–2011
- Spouse: Zizi Jeanmaire (m. 1954)
- Awards: Prix Benois de la Danse
- Website: www.roland-petit.fr

Roland Petit (French: [ʁɔlɑ̃ pəti]; 13 January 1924 – 10 July 2011) was a French ballet company director, choreographer and dancer. He trained at the Paris Opera Ballet school, and became well known for his creative ballets.

== Life and work ==
The son of shoe designer Rose Repetto, Petit was born in Villemomble, near Paris. He trained at the Paris Opéra Ballet school under Gustave Ricaux and Serge Lifar and began to dance with the corps de ballet in 1940. He founded the Ballets des Champs-Élysées in 1945 and the Ballets de Paris in 1948, at Théâtre Marigny, with Zizi Jeanmaire as star dancer.

Petit collaborated with Constant Lambert (Ballabile - 1950), Henri Dutilleux (Le Loup - 1953), Serge Gainsbourg, Yves Saint-Laurent and César Baldaccini and participated in several French and American films. He returned to the Paris Opéra in 1965 to mount a production of Notre Dame de Paris (with music by Maurice Jarre). He continued to direct ballets for the largest theatres of France, Italy, Germany, Great Britain, Canada and Cuba.

In 1970 Petit resigned after only four months as director of ballet at the Paris Opera. He resigned by letter from home (because he had no telephone in his office) protesting about poor working conditions, the failure in labour contract negotiations, and thwarting of his plans for three new ballet productions of which management only accepted one.

In 1968, his ballet Turangalîla provoked a small revolution within the Paris Opéra. Four years later, in 1972, he founded the Ballet National de Marseille with the piece "Pink Floyd Ballet", created in collaboration with the band of the same name. He directed the Ballet National de Marseille for the next 26 years. For the décor of his ballets, he would work in close collaboration with the painter Jean Carzou (1907–2000), but also with other artists such as Max Ernst.

The creator of more than 50 ballets across all genres, he choreographed for a plethora of famed international dancers. He refused the free technical effects; he did not stop reinventing his style, language, and became a master in the arts of pas de deux and of narrative ballet, but he succeeded also in abstract ballets. He collaborated also with the nouveaux réalistes including Martial Raysse, Niki de Saint Phalle and Jean Tinguely.

Le jeune homme et la mort ("The Young Man and Death") of 1946 (libretto by Jean Cocteau) is considered his magnum opus and it is also his most well-known work; the choreography and the costumes are of astonishing modernity. In his 1949 ballet Carmen, he made an unusual use of the en dedans, while he gave a non-figurative treatment to Turangalîla.

Among the films to which he contributed are Symphonie en blanc by René Chanas and François Ardoin (1942 short film on history of dance) in which he appeared as a dancer; the choreography for the 1948 film Alice in Wonderland, The Glass Slipper in 1954, Anything Goes (with others) in 1956, and Black Tights as choreographer, writer, and dancer in 1960.

== Honours ==
In 1994, he was awarded the Prix Benois de la Danse as choreographer.

== Personal life ==
In 1954, Petit married dancer Zizi Jeanmaire, who performed in a number of his works. His memoirs were published in 1993 under the title J'ai dansé sur les flots ("I Danced on the Waves"). He and Jeanmaire had one daughter, Valentine Petit, a dancer and actress.

Petit died in Geneva, Switzerland, aged 87, of leukemia in 2011.

== Ballets ==
During his career, Petit choreographed 176 works, including:

- Guernica (1945)
- Les forains (1945)
- Le jeune homme et la mort (1946)
- Carmen (1949)
- Ballabile (1950)
- Le loup (1953)
- The Lady in the Ice (1953)
- Notre-Dame de Paris (1965)
- Paradise Lost (1967)
- Kraanerg (1969)
- Pink Floyd Ballet (1972 and later)
- Roland Petit Ballet (1973)
- Proust, ou Les intermittences du coeur (1974)
- L'Arlésienne (1974)
- Coppélia (1975)
- La symphonie fantastique (1975)
- Cyrano de Bergerac (1978)
- Le fantôme de l'Opéra (1980)
- Les amours de Frantz (1981)
- The Four Seasons (music of Antonio Vivaldi, 1984)
- The Blue Angel (1985)
- Clavigo (1999)
- Duke Ellington (2001)
- Les chemins de la création (2004)
