= Bing's Hollywood =

1962 collection of albums by Bing Crosby

Box set by Bing Crosby
- Released: 1962
- Recorded: 1934–1956
- Genre: Popular
- Length: 6:38:02 (total of all 15 albums)
- Label: Decca

Bing Crosby chronology
| The Road to Hong Kong (w/ Bob Hope) (1962) | Bing's Hollywood (1962) | On the Happy Side (1962) |

The Bing's Hollywood series was a Decca Records 15-album set by American singer Bing Crosby of commercial recordings of songs used in his films from 1934 to 1956. Numbered in order from Decca DL4250 to DL4264, the LPs included "Easy to Remember", "Pennies from Heaven", "Pocket Full of Dreams", "East Side of Heaven", "The Road Begins", "Only Forever", "Holiday Inn", "Swinging on a Star", "Accentuate the Positive", "Blue Skies", "But Beautiful", "Sunshine Cake", "Cool of the Evening", "Zing a Little Zong" and "Anything Goes." In the UK, Brunswick Records issued the set with the numbers BING1 to BING 15. In 1988 MCA Universal began reissuing "Bing's Hollywood" on compact disc, but poor sales abruptly halted the series following the release of "Holiday Inn", "Swinging on a Star" and "Blue Skies."

Details of all recordings have been taken from “A Bing Crosby Discography”.

== Background ==
Variety gave the background in its issue of March 14, 1962. “The timing was just right for Decca's massive release of Bing Crosby's Hollywood story. It fits perfectly into the programming pattern being adopted by so many radio stations, which in veering away from Top 40, are going in for marathon spinning of an individual personality. This Crosby release is tailor-made for them, in that it consists of 15 separate L.P's containing 189 songs from over 40 pictures. No singer has come close to that mark and it's a record that's sure to stand for a long, long time. For the average consumer the purchase of the complete series will obviously be hard on the pocket-book but each LP can be obtained separately (the suggested retail price is $3. 98) and each one is a gem. Not only did Crosby have a solid song-selling way right from the beginning, but he had top tune-smiths turning out material for him all the way...The series is virtually a recorded history of the filmusical genre and a credit to all concerned.

== Albums ==
Recording dates follow song titles.

=== Easy to Remember ===
DL 4250. Tracks 1–3 from Here is My Heart, 4–7 from Mississippi, 8–12 from Two for Tonight, 13 from The Big Broadcast of 1936.

Side one
| No. | Title | Writer(s) | Performed with | Length |
|---|---|---|---|---|
| 1. | "Love Is Just Around the Corner" (November 9, 1934) | Lewis E. Gensler, Leo Robin | Georgie Stoll and His Orchestra | 3:00 |
| 2. | "June in January" (November 9, 1934) | Ralph Rainger, Leo Robin | Georgie Stoll and His Orchestra | 3:13 |
| 3. | "With Every Breath I Take" (November 9, 1934) | Ralph Rainger, Leo Robin | Georgie Stoll and His Orchestra | 3:15 |
| 4. | "It's Easy to Remember" (February 21, 1935) | Richard Rodgers, Lorenz Hart | The Rhythmettes, The Three Shades of Blue, and Georgie Stoll and His Orchestra | 3:15 |
| 5. | "Soon" (February 21, 1935) | Rodgers and Hart | Georgie Stoll and His Orchestra | 3:01 |
| 6. | "Swanee River (The Old Folks At Home)" (February 21, 1935) | Stephen Foster | Georgie Stoll and His Orchestra, and The Crinoline Choir | 3:05 |
| 7. | "Down by the River" (February 21, 1935) | Rodgers and Hart | Georgie Stoll and His Orchestra | 2:50 |

Side two
| No. | Title | Writer(s) | Performed with | Length |
|---|---|---|---|---|
| 8. | "Without a Word of Warning" (August 14, 1935) | Harry Revel, Mack Gordon | The Dorsey Brothers Orchestra | 3:07 |
| 9. | "Two for Tonight" (August 14, 1935) | Harry Revel, Mack Gordon | The Dorsey Brothers Orchestra | 2:56 |
| 10. | "From the Top of Your Head to the Tip of Your Toes" (August 14, 1935) | Harry Revel, Mack Gordon | The Dorsey Brothers Orchestra | 3:03 |
| 11. | "I Wish I Were Aladdin" (August 14, 1935) | Harry Revel, Mack Gordon | The Dorsey Brothers Orchestra | 2:59 |
| 12. | "Takes Two to Make a Bargain" (August 14, 1935) | Harry Revel, Mack Gordon | The Dorsey Brothers Orchestra | 2:48 |
| 13. | "I Wished on the Moon" (August 14, 1935) | Ralph Rainger, Dorothy Parker | The Dorsey Brothers Orchestra | 2:50 |
| Total length: | | | | 39:22 |

=== Pennies from Heaven ===
DL 4251. Tracks 1–3 from Anything Goes, tracks 4–6 and 11–12 from Rhythm on the Range, 7–10 from Pennies from Heaven.

Side one
| No. | Title | Writer(s) | Performed with | Length |
|---|---|---|---|---|
| 1. | "Moonburn" (November 13, 1935) | Hoagy Carmichael, Edward Heyman | Georgie Stoll and His Orchestra | 3:10 |
| 2. | "My Heart and I" (November 13, 1935) | Frederick Hollander, Leo Robin | Georgie Stoll and His Orchestra | 3:26 |
| 3. | "Sailor Beware" (November 13, 1935) | Richard Whiting, Leo Robin | Georgie Stoll and His Orchestra | 2:52 |
| 4. | "Empty Saddles" (July 14, 1936) | Billy Hill | Victor Young and His Orchestra | 3:01 |
| 5. | "I'm an Old Cowhand" (July 17, 1936) | Johnny Mercer | Jimmy Dorsey and His Orchestra | 2:40 |
| 6. | "Roundup Lullaby" (July 14, 1936) | Gertrude Ross, Charles Badger Clark | Victor Young and His Orchestra | 3:08 |

Side two
| No. | Title | Writer(s) | Performed with | Length |
|---|---|---|---|---|
| 7. | "Pennies from Heaven" (July 24, 1936) | Arthur Johnston, Johnny Burke | Georgie Stoll and His Orchestra | 3:08 |
| 8. | "Let's Call a Heart a Heart" (July 29, 1936) | Arthur Johnston, Johnny Burke | Georgie Stoll and His Orchestra | 3:04 |
| 9. | "One, Two, Button Your Shoe" (July 29, 1936) | Arthur Johnston, Johnny Burke | Georgie Stoll and His Orchestra | 2:50 |
| 10. | "So Do I" (July 24, 1936) | Arthur Johnston, Johnny Burke | Georgie Stoll and His Orchestra | 3:10 |
| 11. | "I Can't Escape from You" (July 17, 1936) | Leo Robin, Richard A. Whiting | Jimmy Dorsey and His Orchestra | 3:12 |
| 12. | "The House That Jack Built for Jill" (July 17, 1936) | Frederick Hollander, Leo Robin | Jimmy Dorsey and His Orchestra | 2:45 |
| Total length: | | | | 36:26 |

=== Pocket Full of Dreams ===
DL 4252. Tracks 1–4 from Waikiki Wedding, tracks 5–8 from Double or Nothing and 9–12 from Sing You Sinners.

Side one
| No. | Title | Writer(s) | Performed with | Length |
|---|---|---|---|---|
| 1. | "Blue Hawaii" (February 23, 1937) | Ralph Rainger, Leo Robin | Lani McIntire and His Hawaiians | 3:07 |
| 2. | "In a Little Hula Heaven" (February 28, 1937) | Ralph Rainger, Leo Robin | Jimmy Dorsey and His Orchestra | 3:10 |
| 3. | "Sweet Leilani" (February 23, 1937) | Harry Owens | Lani McIntire and His Hawaiians | 2:40 |
| 4. | "Sweet Is the Word for You" (March 5, 1937) | Ralph Rainger, Leo Robin | Victor Young and His Orchestra | 3:11 |
| 5. | "It’s the Natural Thing to Do" (July 12, 1937) | Arthur Johnston, Johnny Burke | John Scott Trotter and His Orchestra | 3:13 |
| 6. | "(You Know It All) Smarty" (July 12, 1937) | Burton Lane, Ralph Freed | John Scott Trotter and His Orchestra | 2:35 |

Side two
| No. | Title | Writer(s) | Performed with | Length |
|---|---|---|---|---|
| 7. | "The Moon Got in My Eyes" (July 12, 1937) | Arthur Johnston, Johnny Burke | John Scott Trotter and His Orchestra | 3:13 |
| 8. | "All You Want to Do Is Dance" (July 12, 1937) | Arthur Johnston, Johnny Burke | John Scott Trotter and His Orchestra | 2:51 |
| 9. | "I've Got a Pocketful of Dreams" (July 11, 1938) | James V. Monaco, Johnny Burke | John Scott Trotter and His Orchestra | 2:38 |
| 10. | "Small Fry" (July 1, 1938) | Hoagy Carmichael, Frank Loesser | Johnny Mercer and Victor Young’s Small Fryers | 3:06 |
| 11. | "Laugh and Call It Love" (July 11, 1938) | James V. Monaco, Johnny Burke | John Scott Trotter and His Orchestra | 2:47 |
| 12. | "Don't Let That Moon Get Away" (July 11, 1938) | James V. Monaco, Johnny Burke | John Scott Trotter and His Orchestra | 2:36 |
| Total length: | | | | 35:07 |

=== East Side of Heaven ===
DL 4253. Tracks 1–3 from Doctor Rhythm, tracks 4–8 from Paris Honeymoon and 9–12 from East Side of Heaven.

Side one
| No. | Title | Writer(s) | Performed with | Length |
|---|---|---|---|---|
| 1. | "On the Sentimental Side" (January 21, 1938) | James V. Monaco, Johnny Burke | John Scott Trotter and His Orchestra | 2:51 |
| 2. | "My Heart Is Taking Lessons" (January 21, 1938) | James V. Monaco, Johnny Burke | John Scott Trotter and His Orchestra | 2:45 |
| 3. | "This Is My Night to Dream" (January 21, 1938) | James V. Monaco, Johnny Burke | John Scott Trotter and His Orchestra | 3:07 |
| 4. | "The Funny Old Hills" (November 4, 1938) | Ralph Rainger, Leo Robin | John Scott Trotter and His Orchestra | 2:44 |
| 5. | "I Have Eyes" (November 4, 1938) | Ralph Rainger, Leo Robin | John Scott Trotter and His Orchestra | 3:04 |
| 6. | "Joobalai" (November 4, 1938) | Ralph Rainger, Leo Robin | John Scott Trotter and His Orchestra | 2:48 |

Side two
| No. | Title | Writer(s) | Performed with | Length |
|---|---|---|---|---|
| 7. | "You're a Sweet Little Headache" (November 4, 1938) | Ralph Rainger, Leo Robin | John Scott Trotter and His Orchestra | 2:50 |
| 8. | "I Ain't Got Nobody" (July 30, 1941) | Roger A. Graham, Spencer Williams | Woody Herman and His Woodchoppers | 3:00 |
| 9. | "East Side of Heaven" (March 10, 1939) | James V. Monaco, Johnny Burke | John Scott Trotter and His Orchestra | 3:01 |
| 10. | "That Sly Old Gentleman" (March 10, 1939) | James V. Monaco, Johnny Burke | John Scott Trotter and His Orchestra | 3:01 |
| 11. | "Hang Your Heart on a Hickory Limb" (March 10, 1939) | James V. Monaco, Johnny Burke | John Scott Trotter and His Orchestra | 2:32 |
| 12. | "Sing a Song of Sunbeams" (March 10, 1939) | James V. Monaco, Johnny Burke | John Scott Trotter and His Orchestra | 2:50 |
| Total length: | | | | 34:33 |

=== The Road Begins ===
DL 4254. Tracks 1–6 from The Star Maker, tracks 7, 10, 12–14 from If I Had My Way and 8–9 and 11 from Road to Singapore.

Side one
| No. | Title | Writer(s) | Performed with | Length |
|---|---|---|---|---|
| 1. | "An Apple for the Teacher" (June 22, 1939) | James V. Monaco, Johnny Burke | Connee Boswell and John Scott Trotter and His Orchestra | 3:03 |
| 2. | "In My Merry Oldsmobile" (June 30, 1939) | Vincent P. Bryan, Gus Edwards | John Scott Trotter and His Orchestra, and The Music Maids | 2:24 |
| 3. | "A Man and His Dream" (June 9, 1939) | James V. Monaco, Johnny Burke | John Scott Trotter and His Orchestra | 3:02 |
| 4. | "Medley of Gus Edwards Song Hits" (June 30, 1939) | Gus Edwards | John Scott Trotter and His Orchestra, and The Music Maids | 3:10 |
| 5. | "Still the Bluebird Sings" (June 9, 1939) | James V. Monaco, Johnny Burke | John Scott Trotter and His Orchestra | 3:37 |
| 6. | "Go Fly a Kite" (June 9, 1939) | James V. Monaco, Johnny Burke | John Scott Trotter and His Orchestra | 2:39 |
| 7. | "If I Had My Way" (March 31, 1939) | James Kendis, Lou Klein | John Scott Trotter and His Orchestra | 2:49 |

Side two
| No. | Title | Writer(s) | Performed with | Length |
|---|---|---|---|---|
| 8. | "Too Romantic" (December 15, 1939) | James V. Monaco, Johnny Burke | John Scott Trotter and His Orchestra | 3:09 |
| 9. | "Sweet Potato Piper" (December 15, 1939) | James V. Monaco, Johnny Burke | John Scott Trotter’s Frying Pan Five, and The Foursome | 2:22 |
| 10. | "April Played the Fiddle" (April 12, 1940) | James V. Monaco, Johnny Burke | John Scott Trotter and His Orchestra | 3:00 |
| 11. | "The Moon and the Willow Tree" (December 15, 1939) | Victor Schertzinger, Johnny Burke | John Scott Trotter and His Orchestra | 3:08 |
| 12. | "I Haven’t Time to Be a Millionaire" (April 12, 1940) | James V. Monaco, Johnny Burke | John Scott Trotter and His Orchestra | 3:09 |
| 13. | "Meet the Sun Half-Way" (April 12, 1940) | James V. Monaco, Johnny Burke | John Scott Trotter and His Orchestra | 2:34 |
| 14. | "The Pessimistic Character With the Crap Apple Face" (April 12, 1940) | James V. Monaco, Johnny Burke | John Scott Trotter and His Orchestra | 2:29 |
| Total length: | | | | 40:35 |

=== Only Forever ===
DL 4255. Tracks 1–4 from Rhythm on the River, tracks 5–8 from Road to Zanzibar and 9–12 from Birth of the Blues.

Side one
| No. | Title | Writer(s) | Performed with | Length |
|---|---|---|---|---|
| 1. | "Only Forever" (July 3, 1940) | James V. Monaco, Johnny Burke | John Scott Trotter and His Orchestra | 3:07 |
| 2. | "That’s for Me" (July 10, 1940) | James V. Monaco, Johnny Burke | John Scott Trotter and His Orchestra | 3:05 |
| 3. | "Rhythm on the River" (July 10, 1940) | James V. Monaco, Johnny Burke | John Scott Trotter and His Orchestra | 3:01 |
| 4. | "When the Moon Comes over Madison Square" (July 3, 1940) | James V. Monaco, Johnny Burke | John Scott Trotter and His Orchestra | 2:38 |
| 5. | "Birds of a Feather" (December 20, 1940) | Jimmy Van Heusen, Johnny Burke | John Scott Trotter and His Orchestra | 2:33 |
| 6. | "You’re Dangerous" (December 20, 1940) | Jimmy Van Heusen, Johnny Burke | John Scott Trotter and His Orchestra | 2:51 |

Side two
| No. | Title | Writer(s) | Performed with | Length |
|---|---|---|---|---|
| 7. | "It's Always You" (December 3, 1940) | Jimmy Van Heusen, Johnny Burke | John Scott Trotter and His Orchestra | 3:09 |
| 8. | "You Lucky People, You" (December 20, 1940) | Jimmy Van Heusen, Johnny Burke | John Scott Trotter and His Orchestra | 2:44 |
| 9. | "The Birth of the Blues" (May 26, 1941) | Buddy De Sylva, Lew Brown, Ray Henderson | Jack Teagarden and His Orchestra | 3:12 |
| 10. | "Wait 'Till the Sun Shines, Nellie" (March 13, 1942) | Andrew B. Sterling, Harry von Tilzer | Mary Martin and John Scott Trotter and His Orchestra | 2:32 |
| 11. | "My Melancholy Baby" (December 12, 1938) | George A Norton, Ernie Burnet | John Scott Trotter and His Orchestra | 2:58 |
| 12. | "The Waiter and the Porter and the Upstairs Maid" (May 26, 1941) | Johnny Mercer | Mary Martin and Jack Teagarden and His Orchestra | 3:09 |
| Total length: | | | | 34:59 |

=== Holiday Inn ===
DL 4256. All tracks from Holiday Inn. Tracks 6 and 10 are solos by Fred Astaire.

Side one
| No. | Title | Writer(s) | Performed with | Length |
|---|---|---|---|---|
| 1. | "Happy Holiday" (June 1, 1942) | Irving Berlin | the Music Maids and Hal, and John Scott Trotter and His Orchestra | 2:46 |
| 2. | "Be Careful, It's My Heart" (June 1, 1942) | Irving Berlin | John Scott Trotter and His Orchestra | 2:42 |
| 3. | "Abraham" (May 29, 1942) | Irving Berlin | the Ken Darby Singers and John Scott Trotter and His Orchestra | 2:45 |
| 4. | "Easter Parade" (June 1, 1942) | Irving Berlin | John Scott Trotter and His Orchestra | 2:48 |
| 5. | "The Song of Freedom" (May 29, 1942) | Irving Berlin | the Ken Darby Singers and John Scott Trotter and His Orchestra | 2:22 |
| 6. | "I Can't Tell a Lie" (May 27, 1942) | Irving Berlin | Fred Astaire (solo), and Bob Crosby and His Orchestra | 2:44 |

Side two
| No. | Title | Writer(s) | Performed with | Length |
|---|---|---|---|---|
| 7. | "Lazy" (May 25, 1942) | Irving Berlin | Bob Crosby and His Orchestra | 2:28 |
| 8. | "I'll Capture Your Heart" (May 27, 1942) | Irving Berlin | Margaret Lenhart and Bob Crosby and His Orchestra | 2:23 |
| 9. | "(I've Got) Plenty to Be Thankful For" (May 25, 1942) | Irving Berlin | Bob Crosby and His Orchestra | 2:57 |
| 10. | "You're Easy to Dance With" (May 27, 1942) | Irving Berlin | Fred Astaire (solo), and Bob Crosby and His Orchestra | 2:59 |
| 11. | "Let's Start the New Year Right" (May 25, 1942) | Irving Berlin | Bob Crosby and His Orchestra | 2:32 |
| 12. | "White Christmas" (March 19, 1947) | Irving Berlin | John Scott Trotter and His Orchestra, and the Ken Darby Singers | 3:01 |
| Total length: | | | | 32:27 |

=== Swinging on a Star ===
DL 4257. Tracks 1–4 from Road to Morocco, tracks 5 and 6 from Dixie and tracks 7–12 from Going My Way.

Side one
| No. | Title | Writer(s) | Performed with | Length |
|---|---|---|---|---|
| 1. | "The Road to Morocco" (December 8, 1944) | Jimmy Van Heusen, Johnny Burke | Bob Hope and Vic Schoen and His Orchestra | 2:33 |
| 2. | "Moonlight Becomes You" (June 12, 1942) | Jimmy Van Heusen, Johnny Burke | John Scott Trotter and His Orchestra | 3:09 |
| 3. | "Ain’t Got a Dime to My Name" (June 10, 1942) | Jimmy Van Heusen, Johnny Burke | Vic Schoen and His Orchestra | 2:52 |
| 4. | "Constantly" (June 12, 1942) | Jimmy Van Heusen, Johnny Burke | John Scott Trotter and His Orchestra | 2:42 |
| 5. | "Sunday, Monday or Always" (July 2, 1943) | Jimmy Van Heusen, Johnny Burke | The Ken Darby Singers | 2:35 |
| 6. | "If You Please" (July 2, 1943) | Jimmy Van Heusen, Johnny Burke | The Ken Darby Singers | 3:06 |

Side two
| No. | Title | Writer(s) | Performed with | Length |
|---|---|---|---|---|
| 7. | "Going My Way" (February 7, 1944) | Jimmy Van Heusen, Johnny Burke | John Scott Trotter and His Orchestra | 2:50 |
| 8. | "Swinging on a Star" (February 7, 1944) | Jimmy Van Heusen, Johnny Burke | the Williams Brothers Quartet* and John Scott Trotter and His Orchestra | 2:28 |
| 9. | "The Day after Forever" (February 7, 1944) | Jimmy Van Heusen, Johnny Burke | John Scott Trotter and His Orchestra | 3:00 |
| 10. | "Too-Ra-Loo-Ra-Loo-Ral" (July 17, 1945) | James Royce Shannon | John Scott Trotter and His Orchestra | 3:17 |
| 11. | "Ave Maria" (April 25, 1945) | Franz Schubert | Victor Young and His Orchestra | 3:16 |
| 12. | "Silent Night" (March 19, 1947) | Joseph Mohr, Franz Xaver Gruber | John Scott Trotter and His Orchestra, and the Ken Darby Singers | 2:34 |
| Total length: | | | | 34:22 |

*Featuring a young Andy Williams

=== Accentuate the Positive ===
DL 4258. Tracks 1–4 from Here Come the Waves, tracks 5–8 from The Bells of St. Mary's and tracks 9–12 from Road to Utopia.

Side one
| No. | Title | Writer(s) | Performed with | Length |
|---|---|---|---|---|
| 1. | "Ac-Cent-Tchu-Ate the Positive" (December 8, 1944) | Harold Arlen, Johnny Mercer | The Andrews Sisters and Vic Schoen and His Orchestra | 2:40 |
| 2. | "Let’s Take the Long Way Home" (December 4, 1944) | Harold Arlen, Johnny Mercer | John Scott Trotter and His Orchestra | 2:41 |
| 3. | "There's a Fella Waitin' in Poughkeepsier" (December 8, 1944) | Harold Arlen, Johnny Mercer | The Andrews Sisters and Vic Schoen and His Orchestra | 2:47 |
| 4. | "I Promise You" (December 15, 1944) | Harold Arlen, Johnny Mercer | John Scott Trotter and His Orchestra | 3:11 |
| 5. | "The Bells of St. Mary's" (September 10, 1945) | A. Emmett Adams, Douglas Furbe | John Scott Trotter and His Orchestra | 3:04 |
| 6. | "Adeste Fideles" (June 8, 1942) | Canon Fred Oakley, John Francis Wade | John Scott Trotter and His Orchestra and Max Terr's Mixed Chorus | 3:08 |

Side two
| No. | Title | Writer(s) | Performed with | Length |
|---|---|---|---|---|
| 7. | "Aren’t You Glad You're You?" (September 10, 1945) | Jimmy Van Heusen, Johnny Burke | John Scott Trotter and His Orchestra | 2:50 |
| 8. | "In the Land of Beginning Again" (September 10, 1945) | George W. Meyer, Grant Clarke | John Scott Trotter and His Orchestra | 3:07 |
| 9. | "Put It There, Pal" (December 8, 1944) | Jimmy Van Heusen, Johnny Burke | Bob Hope and Vic Schoen and His Orchestra | 2:21 |
| 10. | "Would You?" (July 19, 1944) | Jimmy Van Heusen, Johnny Burke | John Scott Trotter and His Orchestra | 2:46 |
| 11. | "It's Anybody's Spring" (July 17, 1944) | Jimmy Van Heusen, Johnny Burke | John Scott Trotter and His Orchestra | 2:39 |
| 12. | "Welcome to My Dream" (July 17, 1944) | Jimmy Van Heusen, Johnny Burke | John Scott Trotter and His Orchestra | 2:24 |
| 13. | "Personality" (January 16, 1946) | Jimmy Van Heusen, Johnny Burke | Eddie Condon and His Orchestra | 3:30 |
| Total length: | | | | 37:08 |

=== Blue Skies ===
DL 4259. Tracks 1–9 from Blue Skies, tracks 10–12 from Out of This World.

Side one
| No. | Title | Writer(s) | Performed with | Length |
|---|---|---|---|---|
| 1. | "Blue Skies" (July 18, 1946) | Irving Berlin | John Scott Trotter and His Orchestra | 3:23 |
| 2. | "All By Myself" (July 18, 1946) | Irving Berlin | John Scott Trotter and His Orchestra | 3:14 |
| 3. | "A Couple of Song and Dance Men" (July 24, 1946) | Irving Berlin | Fred Astaire and John Scott Trotter and His Orchestra | 2:17 |
| 4. | "I've Got My Captain Working for Me Now" (July 24, 1946) | Irving Berlin | John Scott Trotter and His Orchestra | 2:34 |
| 5. | "(I'll See You In) C-U-B-A" (July 24, 1946) | Irving Berlin | Trudy Erwin and John Scott Trotter and His Orchestra | 3:06 |
| 6. | "(Running Around in Circles) Getting Nowhere" (July 18, 1946) | Irving Berlin | John Scott Trotter and His Orchestra | 2:37 |

Side two
| No. | Title | Writer(s) | Performed with | Length |
|---|---|---|---|---|
| 7. | "Everybody Step" (July 19, 1946) | Irving Berlin | John Scott Trotter and His Orchestra | 2:25 |
| 8. | "You Keep Coming Back Like a Song" (July 18, 1946) | Irving Berlin | John Scott Trotter and His Orchestra | 2:50 |
| 9. | "A Serenade to an Old-Fashioned Girl" (July 19, 1946) | Irving Berlin | John Scott Trotter and His Orchestra | 3:03 |
| 10. | "I’d Rather Be Me" (January 21, 1945) | Eddie Cherkose, Sam Coslow, Felix Bernard | John Scott Trotter and His Orchestra | 2:47 |
| 11. | "Out of This World" (December 4, 1944) | Harold Arlen, Johnny Mercer | John Scott Trotter and His Orchestra | 2:56 |
| 12. | "June Comes Around Every Year" (December 11, 1944) | Harold Arlen, Johnny Mercer | John Scott Trotter and His Orchestra | 2:41 |
| Total length: | | | | 33:53 |

=== But Beautiful ===
DL 4260. Tracks 1–4 from Welcome Stranger, Tracks 5–8 from Road to Rio, tracks 9–12 from The Emperor Waltz and track 13 from Variety Girl.

Side one
| No. | Title | Writer(s) | Performed with | Length |
|---|---|---|---|---|
| 1. | "Smile Right Back at the Sun" (November 14, 1946) | Jimmy Van Heusen, Johnny Burke | John Scott Trotter and His Orchestra | 2:41 |
| 2. | "As Long As I'm Dreaming" (November 14, 1946) | Jimmy Van Heusen, Johnny Burke | John Scott Trotter and His Orchestra | 3:07 |
| 3. | "My Heart Is a Hobo" (November 19, 1946) | Jimmy Van Heusen, Johnny Burke | John Scott Trotter and His Orchestra | 2:35 |
| 4. | "Country Style" (November 19, 1946) | Jimmy Van Heusen, Johnny Burke | The Calico Kids and John Scott Trotter and His Orchestra | 3:13 |
| 5. | "Experience" (November 13, 1947) | Jimmy Van Heusen, Johnny Burke | Nan Wynn and Victor Young and His Orchestra | 2:28 |
| 6. | "Apalachicola" (November 25, 1947) | Jimmy Van Heusen, Johnny Burke | The Andrews Sisters and Vic Schoen and His Orchestra | 2:53 |

Side two
| No. | Title | Writer(s) | Performed with | Length |
|---|---|---|---|---|
| 7. | "But Beautiful" (November 13, 1947) | Jimmy Van Heusen, Johnny Burke | Victor Young and His Orchestra | 2:38 |
| 8. | "You Don't Have to Know the Language" (November 25, 1947) | Jimmy Van Heusen, Johnny Burke | The Andrews Sisters and Vic Schoen and His Orchestra | 2:55 |
| 9. | "The Friendly Mountains" (March 17, 1947) | Jimmy Van Heusen, Johnny Burke | Victor Young and His Orchestra | 3:04 |
| 10. | "I Kiss Your Hand, Madame" (January 17, 1947) | Sam M. Lewis, Joe Young, Ralph Erwin | Victor Young and His Orchestra | 3:09 |
| 11. | "The Kiss in Your Eyes" (January 17, 1947) | Richard Heuberger, Johnny Burke | Victor Young and His Orchestra | 3:01 |
| 12. | "Emperor Waltz" (March 17, 1947) | Johann Strauss, Johnny Burke | Victor Young and His Orchestra | 2:38 |
| 13. | "Tallahassee" (March 26, 1947) | Frank Loesser | The Andrews Sisters and Vic Schoen and His Orchestra | 3:01 |
| Total length: | | | | 37:23 |

=== Sunshine Cake ===
DL 4261. Tracks 1–4 from A Connecticut Yankee in King Arthur's Court, tracks 5–8 from Top o' the Morning, tracks 9–12 from Riding High.

Side one
| No. | Title | Writer(s) | Performed with | Length |
|---|---|---|---|---|
| 1. | "Once and for Always" (December 27, 1947) | Jimmy Van Heusen, Johnny Burke | the Ken Darby Singers and Victor Young and His Orchestra | 2:49 |
| 2. | "If You Stub Your Toe on the Moon" (December 30, 1947) | Jimmy Van Heusen, Johnny Burke | The Rhythmaires and Victor Young and His Orchestra | 3:01 |
| 3. | "Busy Doing Nothing" (December 27, 1947) | Jimmy Van Heusen, Johnny Burke | Sir Cedric Hardwicke, William Bendix and Victor Young and His Orchestra | 2:57 |
| 4. | "Once and for Always" (December 27, 1947) | Jimmy Van Heusen, Johnny Burke | Rhonda Fleming and Victor Young and His Orchestra | 2:49 |
| 5. | "You're in Love with Someone" (May 10, 1949) | Jimmy Van Heusen, Johnny Burke | Victor Young and His Orchestra, and the Jeff Alexander Chorus | 2:38 |
| 6. | "The Donovans" (June 21, 1949) | Alicia Adélaide Needham, Walter Kent, Francis Fahy | Victor Young and His Orchestra, and the Jeff Alexander Chorus | 3:00 |

Side two
| No. | Title | Writer(s) | Performed with | Length |
|---|---|---|---|---|
| 7. | "Top o' the Morning" (June 21, 1949) | Jimmy Van Heusen, Johnny Burke | Victor Young and His Orchestra, and the Jeff Alexander Chorus | 2:48 |
| 8. | "Oh, 'Tis Sweet to Think" (May 31, 1949) | Thomas Moore | Ann Blyth and Simon Rady and His Orchestra | 3:32 |
| 9. | "Sunshine Cake" (May 10, 1949) | Jimmy Van Heusen, Johnny Burke | Carol Richards and Victor Young and His Orchestra, and the Jeff Alexander Chorus | 3:03 |
| 10. | "A Sure Thing" (May 10, 1949) | Jimmy Van Heusen, Johnny Burke | Victor Young and His Orchestra, and the Jeff Alexander Chorus | 3:06 |
| 11. | "The Horse Told Me" (June 21, 1949) | Jimmy Van Heusen, Johnny Burke | Victor Young and His Orchestra, and the Jeff Alexander Chorus | 2:57 |
| 12. | "Someplace on Anywhere Road" (June 21, 1949) | Jimmy Van Heusen, Johnny Burke | Victor Young and His Orchestra, and the Jeff Alexander Chorus | 2:43 |
| Total length: | | | | 35:23 |

=== Cool of the Evening ===
DL 4262. Tracks 1–6, 11–12 from Mr. Music, tracks 7–10 from Here Comes the Groom.

Side one
| No. | Title | Writer(s) | Performed with | Length |
|---|---|---|---|---|
| 1. | "Accidents Will Happen" (June 21, 1950) | Jimmy Van Heusen, Johnny Burke | Victor Young and His Orchestra | 2:47 |
| 2. | "Life Is So Peculiar" (March 24, 1950) | Jimmy Van Heusen, Johnny Burke | The Andrews Sisters and Vic Schoen and his Orchestra | 2:48 |
| 3. | "And You’ll Be Home" (June 21, 1950) | Jimmy Van Heusen, Johnny Burke | Victor Young and His Orchestra, and the Ken Lane Singers | 3:08 |
| 4. | "Milady" (April 11, 1950) | Jimmy Van Heusen, Johnny Burke | Dorothy Kirsten and Jay Blackton and His Orchestra | 2:38 |
| 5. | "Wouldn’t It Be Funny?" (June 21, 1950) | Jimmy Van Heusen, Johnny Burke | Victor Young and His Orchestra | 2:49 |
| 6. | "Once More the Blue and White" (June 21, 1950) | Jimmy Van Heusen, Johnny Burke | Victor Young and His Orchestra, and the Ken Lane Singers | 1:58 |

Side two
| No. | Title | Writer(s) | Performed with | Length |
|---|---|---|---|---|
| 7. | "In the Cool, Cool, Cool of the Evening" (June 20, 1951) | Johnny Mercer, Hoagy Carmichael | Jane Wyman and Matty Matlock and His All Stars, and Four Hits and a Miss | 3:20 |
| 8. | "Your Own Little House" (June 20, 1951) | Jay Livingston, Ray Evans | John Scott Trotter and His Orchestra | 3:22 |
| 9. | "Misto Cristofo Columbo" (June 20, 1951) | Jay Livingston, Ray Evans | Jane Wyman and Matty Matlock and His All Stars, and Four Hits and a Miss | 3:13 |
| 10. | "Bonne Nuit (Goodnight)" (June 20, 1951) | Jay Livingston, Ray Evans | John Scott Trotter and His Orchestra | 3:14 |
| 11. | "Accidents Will Happen" (April 11, 1950) | Jimmy Van Heusen, Johnny Burke | Dorothy Kirsten and Jay Blackton and His Orchestra | 2:38 |
| 12. | "High on the List" (March 24, 1950) | Jimmy Van Heusen, Johnny Burke | The Andrews Sisters and Vic Schoen and his Orchestra | 3:01 |
| Total length: | | | | 34:56 |

=== Zing a Little Zong ===
DL 4263. Tracks 1–6 from Just for You, tracks 7–12 from Road to Bali.

Side one
| No. | Title | Writer(s) | Performed with | Length |
|---|---|---|---|---|
| 1. | "A Flight of Fancy" (February 14, 1952) | Harry Warren, Leo Robin | Camarata and His Orchestra | 3:01 |
| 2. | "Just for You" (February 14, 1952) | Harry Warren, Leo Robin | Camarata and His Orchestra | 2:57 |
| 3. | "I’ll Si-si Ya in Bahia" (February 21, 1952) | Harry Warren, Leo Robin | The Andrews Sisters and John Scott Trotter and His Orchestra | 2:54 |
| 4. | "The Live Oak Tree" (February 21, 1952) | Harry Warren, Leo Robin | The Andrews Sisters and John Scott Trotter and His Orchestra | 2:48 |
| 5. | "Zing a Little Zong" (May 8, 1952) | Harry Warren, Leo Robin | Jane Wyman, Nathan Van Cleave and His Orchestra, and Jud Conlon’s Rhythmaires | 2:30 |
| 6. | "On the 10:10 from Ten-Ten-Tennessee" (May 8, 1952) | Harry Warren, Leo Robin | Ben Lessy and Nathan Van Cleave and His Orchestra | 3:23 |

Side two
| No. | Title | Writer(s) | Performed with | Length |
|---|---|---|---|---|
| 7. | "The Road to Bali" (June 24, 1952) | Jimmy Van Heusen, Johnny Burke | Bob Hope and Sonny Burke and His Orchestra, and The Rhythmaires | 2:31 |
| 8. | "Chicago Style" (June 23, 1952) | Jimmy Van Heusen, Johnny Burke | Bob Hope and Joe Lilley and His Orchestra | 2:49 |
| 9. | "Hoot Mon" (June 23, 1952) | Jimmy Van Heusen, Johnny Burke | Bob Hope and Sonny Burke and His Orchestra, and The Mellomen | 2:35 |
| 10. | "The Merry-go-run-around" (June 24, 1952) | Jimmy Van Heusen, Johnny Burke | Bob Hope and Peggy Lee and Sonny Burke and His Orchestra | 2:31 |
| 11. | "To See You Is to Love You" (June 20, 1952) | Jimmy Van Heusen, Johnny Burke | Axel Stordahl and His Orchestra | 3:11 |
| 12. | "Moonflowers" (June 20, 1952) | Jimmy Van Heusen, Johnny Burke | Peggy Lee (solo) with Axel Stordahl and His Orchestra | 3:12 |
| Total length: | | | | 34:22 |

=== Anything Goes ===
DL 4264. Tracks 1–4 from Little Boy Lost, tracks 5–8 from The Country Girl tracks 9–12 from Anything Goes.

Side one
| No. | Title | Writer(s) | Performed with | Length |
|---|---|---|---|---|
| 1. | "The Magic Window" (February 9, 1953) | Jimmy Van Heusen, Johnny Burke | John Scott Trotter and his Orchestra | 3:18 |
| 2. | "Cela M'est Egal (If It's All the Same to You)" (March 12, 1953) | Jimmy Van Heusen, Johnny Burke | John Scott Trotter and his Orchestra | 2:31 |
| 3. | "A Propos De Rien" (March 12, 1953) | Jimmy Van Heusen, Johnny Burke | John Scott Trotter and his Orchestra | 3:07 |
| 4. | "Violets and Violins" (March 12, 1953) | Miarka Laparcerie, Jack Lawrence | John Scott Trotter and his Orchestra | 2:25 |
| 5. | "It's Mine, It's Yours (The Pitchman)" (December 23, 1954) | Ira Gershwin, Harold Arlen | Girl's Trio with Joe Lilley and his Orchestra | 2:44 |
| 6. | "Dissertation on the State of Bliss (Love and Learn)" (December 23, 1954) | Ira Gershwin, Harold Arlen | Patty Andrews | 3:10 |
| 7. | "The Land Around Us" (December 23, 1954) | Ira Gershwin, Harold Arlen | Joseph J. Lilley and his Orchestra | 2:47 |

Side two
| No. | Title | Writer(s) | Performed with | Length |
|---|---|---|---|---|
| 8. | "The Search Is Through" (December 23, 1954) | Ira Gershwin, Harold Arlen | Joseph J. Lilley and his Orchestra | 2:51 |
| 9. | "You're the Top" (February 23, 1956) | Cole Porter | Mitzi Gaynor and Joseph Lilley and His Orchestra | 2:29 |
| 10. | "Ya Gotta Give the People Hoke" (April 9, 1955) | (Jimmy Van Heusen, Sammy Cahn | Donald O'Connor and Joseph Lilley and His Orchestra | 3:15 |
| 11. | "All Through the Night" (February 23, 1956) | Cole Porter | Joseph Lilley and His Orchestra | 2:58 |
| 12. | "A Second Hand Turban and a Crystal Ball" (May 23, 1955) | Jimmy Van Heusen, Sammy Cahn | Donald O’Connor and Joseph Lilley and His Orchestra | 6:10 |
| 13. | "Blow, Gabriel, Blow" (June 1, 1955) | Cole Porter | Donald O’Connor, Mitzi Gaynor, Jeanmaire and Joseph Lilley and His Orchestra | 4:49 |
| Total length: | | | | 42:34 |
