= Sinner or Saint =

Sinner or Saint may refer to:

- Sinner or Saint (film), a 1923 American silent film
- "Sinner or Saint" (song), a 1952 song recorded by Georgia Gibbs, Sarah Vaughan, et al.
- Sinner or Saint (TV series), a 2011 Philippine television drama series
