= Amy Gibson =

American actress

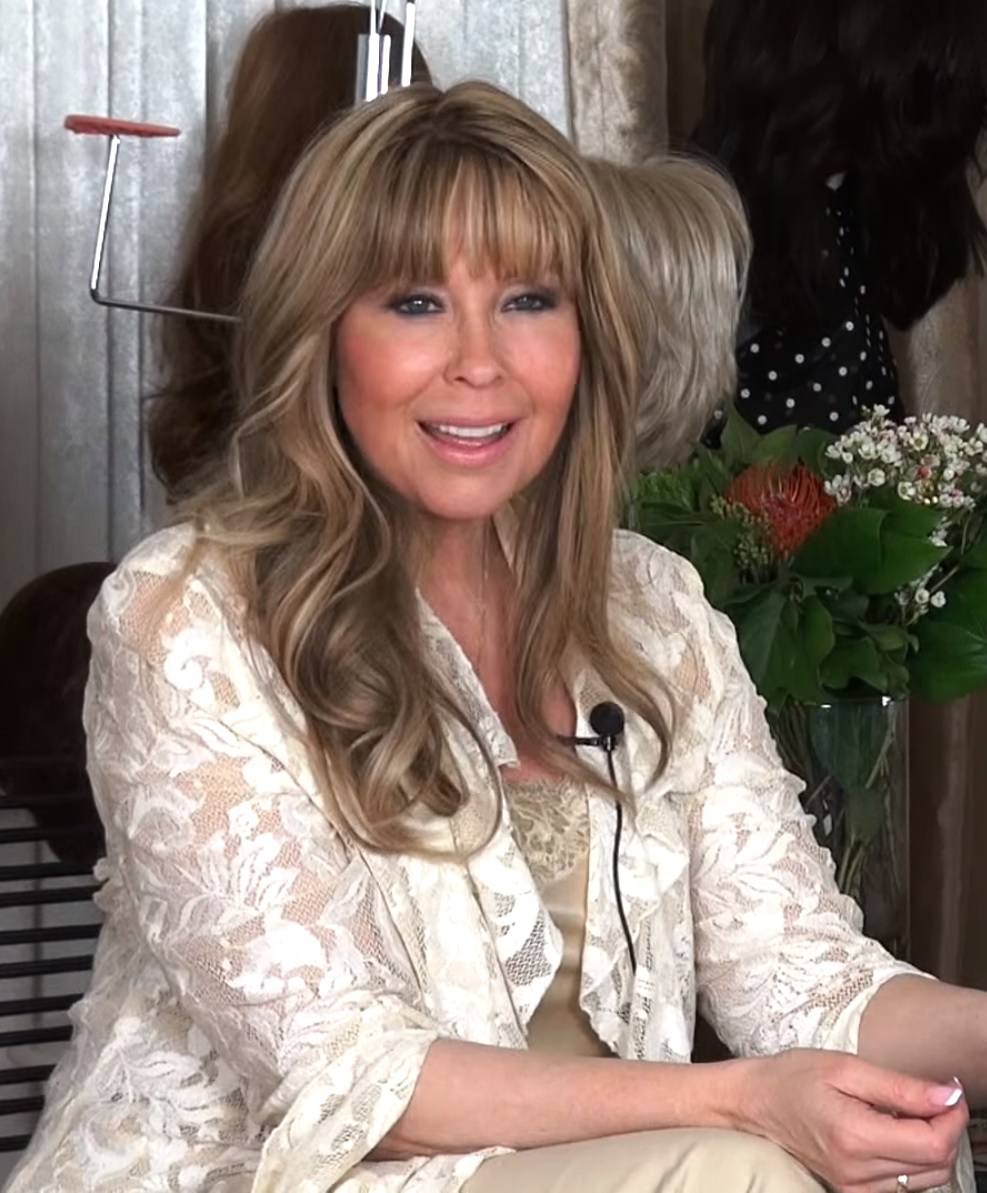
- Gibson interviewed by Princess Halliday in 2016
- Born: November 25, 1960 (age 64); Westchester County, New York, U.S.
- Occupation(s): Actress, businesswoman
- Relatives: Jody Gibson (sister); Georgia Gibbs (aunt)

Amy Gibson (born November 25, 1960) is an American daytime television Emmy-nominated actress and businesswoman.

== Career ==
Gibson's credits include Love of Life (Lynn Henderson), Young and the Restless (Alana Anthony Jackson), and General Hospital (Colette Francoise) in the 1980s.

== Personal life ==
Gibson is the younger sister of Jody Gibson and the niece of singer Georgia Gibbs, a recording artist with a star on the Hollywood Walk of Fame. Her mother Tobe Gibson is the talent agent who discovered Tom Cruise.

Secretly bald for over 20 years due to the medical condition alopecia areata, Gibson built a post-acting career in wig manufacturing and consulting services to those in need of guidance and support who are dealing with hair loss.

== Filmography ==
=== Film ===
Year	Title	Role	Notes
1980	Airplane!	Soldier's Girl	
1981	King of the Mountain	Roger's Girl	
2013	A Split Personality	Dancer	
2013	Baby Let Your Hair Hang Down	Amy	Documentary

=== Television ===
Year	Title	Role	Notes
1979	Friendships, Secrets and Lies	Marie	Television film
1980	One Day at a Time	Claudia Faraday	Episode: "Girl with a Past"
1980	The Love Boat	Harriet Bryce	1 episode
1980	The Facts of Life	Margo	Episode: "The New Girl: Part 2"
1981	Vegas	Angie Wilson	Episode: "Backlash"
1982	Happy Days	Alice	Episode: "Great Expectations"
1988	General Hospital	Collette Francois	Episode dated August 9, 1988
2000	The Street	Cheryl	Episode: "Closet Cases"
