= Evil Laugh =

1986 American slasher film directed and starring Dominick Brascia

- Release poster
- Directed by: Dominick Brascia, Jr.
- Screenplay by: Steven Baio; Dominick Brascia, Jr.
- Produced by: Steven Baio; Dominick Brascia, Jr.
- Starring: Steven Baio; Kim McKamy; Tony Griffin; Jody Gibson; Johnny Venocur; Dominick Brascia
- Cinematography: Stephen Sealy
- Edited by: Brion McIntosh; Michael Scott
- Music by: David Shapiro
- Production company: Wildfire Productions
- Release date: 1986
- Running time: 87 minutes
- Country: United States

Evil Laugh is a 1986 American slasher film directed and starring Steven Baio, Kim McKamy, Tony Griffin, Jody Gibson with Johnny Venocur and Dominick Brascia, Jr. The film is about a group of medical students attacked by a masked killer while repairing a building over the weekend.

== Plot ==
A group of medical students plan to buy an abandoned orphanage to reopen. One of the doctors, Jerry, meets with the owner. Sorting groceries in the kitchen, Jerry is murdered by a masked assailant, who cuts his heart out. The rest of the students arrive, including horror fan Barney. Wondering where Jerry went, Barney unknowingly uses his heart in a dish for that night's dinner.

At dinner, the police chief suddenly arrives, inquiring about a missing delivery boy (who had been murdered by the killer with a drill). The students say they haven't seen him, and the chief warns them to be careful. He and a deputy are later murdered by the killer. One of the students, Connie, tells the others of the house's history: it used to be an orphanage, and the caretaker Martin was accused of pedophilia by three of the children. He was put on trial, and his father killed himself before Martin was found not guilty. In revenge Martin killed all of the children, then set the house on fire.

The killer murders several of the students, as well as the owner, Mr Burns. Barney and Connie confront the killer, revealed to be Burns' wife, Sadie, who was Martin's mother. Barney shoots and kills Mrs Burns. Two weeks later, Connie is seemingly attacked by the killer, but it turns out to be Barney pulling a prank. She suffers a mental break, stabbing Barney to death with a pair of scissors.

== Cast ==
- Kim McKamy as Connie
- Steven Baio as Johnny Barlony
- Tony Griffin as Sammy Baxton III
- Jerold Pearson as Barney White
- Myles O'Brien as Mark Armstrong
- Jody Gibson as Tina
- Howard Weiss as Mr. Burns
- Karyn O'Bryan as Betty
- Susan Grant as Sadie
- Gary Hays as Jerry
- Hal Shafer as Chief Cash
- Johnny Venocur as Freddy
- Tom Shell as Delivery Boy
- Dominick Brascia as Evil Laugher

== Reception ==
In his overview of horror films from the 1980s, Scott Aaron Stine described the film as "effortless tripe" and that "There is nothing, I repeat, nothing worthwhile or even remotely worthwhile or even remotely memorable about this waste of celluloid."
