= Blue Skies (1946 film) =

Film by Stuart Heisler

- Theatrical release poster
- Directed by: Stuart Heisler
- Screenplay by: Arthur Sheekman
- Adaptation by: Allan Scott
- Story by: Irving Berlin
- Produced by: Sol C. Siegel
- Starring: Bing Crosby; Fred Astaire; Joan Caulfield; Billy De Wolfe; Olga San Juan
- Cinematography: Charles Lang Jr.; William Snyder
- Edited by: LeRoy Stone
- Music by: Irving Berlin
- Production company: Paramount Pictures
- Distributed by: Paramount Pictures
- Release date: October 17, 1946
- Running time: 104 minutes
- Country: United States
- Language: English
- Box office: $5.7 million (US and Canada rentals)

Blue Skies is a 1946 American musical romantic comedy film directed by Stuart Heisler and starring Bing Crosby, Fred Astaire, and Joan Caulfield. Based on a story by Irving Berlin, the film is about a dancer who loves a chorus girl, who in turn loves a compulsive nightclub-opener who cannot stay committed to anything in life for very long. Produced by Sol C. Siegel, Blue Skies was filmed in Technicolor and released by Paramount Pictures. The music, lyrics, and story were written by Berlin, with most of the songs recycled from earlier works.

As in Holiday Inn (1942), the film is designed to showcase Berlin's songs. The plot, which is presented in a series of flashbacks with Astaire as narrator, follows a similar formula of Crosby beating Astaire for the affections of a leading lady. Comedy is principally provided by Billy De Wolfe, and several musical numbers are performed by Olga San Juan.

Caulfield was the protégé of Mark Sandrich, who directed many of the Astaire–Ginger Rogers musicals. Sandrich was originally slated to direct this film, but died of a heart attack during pre-production and Stuart Heisler was drafted in to replace him. Heisler wanted Caulfield replaced, but Crosby—who was having an affair with Caulfield—protected her.

Tap dancer Paul Draper was the initial choice to partner Crosby, but, during the first week of production, Draper's speech impediment and his trenchant criticism of Caulfield's dance ability led Crosby to insist on his replacement by Astaire, who, then 47, decided that this would be his final film and that he would subsequently retire, having spent over 40 years performing before the public. The film was billed as "Astaire's last picture" and its very strong performance at the box office pleased him greatly, as he had dearly wanted to go out on a high note.

The reasons for Astaire's (temporary) retirement remain a source of debate: his own view that he was "tired and running out of gas", the sudden collapse in 1945 of the market for Swing music which left many of his colleagues in jazz high and dry, a desire to devote time to establishing a chain of dancing schools, and a dissatisfaction with roles, as in this film, where he was relegated to playing second fiddle to the lead. This film is most remembered by some today for his celebrated solo performance of "Puttin' On the Ritz", which featured Astaire leading an entire dance line of Astaires.

== Plot ==
Shortly after the end of World War II, aging New York City radio star Jed Potter, who was once a renowned Broadway hoofer, tells his audience a story that remains unfinished, involving a beautiful woman and heavily influenced by Irving Berlin's music.

In 1919, rising dancer Jed falls in love with chorus girl Mary O'Hara while working with her in a show. He attempts to persuade her to join him in Charles Dillingham's new Broadway show, saying it is her chance to break out of the chorus line and become a lead. Mary declines Jed's offer but agrees to let him take her to a nightclub owned by crooner Johnny Adams, Jed's former vaudeville partner and Army buddy. The three go to a party later that night, where Johnny and Mary dance together and confess their feelings for each other. Mary agrees to take the role in the Dillingham show.

On opening night, Mary tells Jed that she wants to marry Johnny, although Jed warns her that his shiftless friend is not the marrying kind. Later, Mary meets with Johnny at his nightclub, which he has just sold while planning to open a new place, and suggests they marry, but he tells her that he does not want stability, prompting her to end their relationship. For the next two years, Jed helps Mary forget Johnny. During a dress rehearsal, Johnny reappears, and Jed tells him of his plans to propose to Mary. When Jed proposes to Mary, she insists she needs more time to think about it.

Jed takes Mary to Johnny's new nightclub, where Johnny and Mary embrace and eventually get married. The couple moves from city to city as Johnny opens and sells a series of nightclubs. Three years later in New York City, after Mary has given birth to a baby girl named Mary Elizabeth, Johnny resolves to settle down and opens the Top Hat, his most successful club. However, some time later, Mary learns that Johnny plans to sell the Top Hat and issues an ultimatum. He sells the club despite her protests, and they divorce.

Years later, Jed and Mary's new show opens in Chicago, where Johnny has recently opened a new club. While Mary is out, Johnny visits Mary Elizabeth, who recognizes him as her father and tells him that Mary will marry Jed the next week. When Jed and Mary visit Johnny's club to invite him to the wedding, Mary is distraught to find that he has left town. Realizing that Mary will always love Johnny, Jed calls off the wedding. Jed becomes drunk before a show in Detroit, and despite Mary's concerns, he goes onstage to perform a dangerous dance on a bridge and accidentally falls, ending his dancing career.

In the present, Jed relates on the radio that Mary blamed herself for his accident, and that he has not seen her since that night. Jed announces that Johnny is in the studio, after touring with the troops during World War II. As Johnny sings "You Keep Coming Back Like a Song", Mary suddenly arrives and they embrace, before Jed, Johnny, and Mary leave the studio together.

== Cast ==
- Bing Crosby as Johnny Adams
- Fred Astaire as Jed Potter
- Joan Caulfield as Mary O'Hara
- Billy De Wolfe as Tony
- Olga San Juan as Nita Nova
- Mikhail Rasumny as François (uncredited)
- Frank Faylen as Mack (uncredited)
- Victoria Horne as Martha, nurse (uncredited)
- Karolyn Grimes as Mary Elizabeth Adams (uncredited)

== Production ==
Joan Caulfield was pulled out of the film, but Paramount changed their mind and put her back in.

== Reception ==
=== Critical response ===
Variety gave the film a favorable review: "Blue Skies is another in the show biz cavalcade cycle and it'll spell beaucoup blue skies and black ink for any exhibitor. With Crosby, Astaire and Joan Caulfield on the marquee, a wealth of Irving Berlin songs and lush Technicolor production values, this filmusical can't miss for terrific grosses ... Certainly, for Astaire, it's perhaps a new triumph. If he ever seriously thought of retiring, 'Skies' should postpone any such ideas ... Crosby is Crosby although a slightly heftier Bing. He's the same troubadour, chirping the ditties as only Crosby does even though his waistline is somewhat more generous than behooves a juve."

In another positive review, Bosley Crowther of The New York Times wrote, "So many screen exercises in the music-album line have been so cluttered up with 'biography' that it is a pleasure at last to see one in which a tune-vender's life and his music are not mutually and mawkishly abused. Such a one is the Paramount's current and cheerfully diverting Blue Skies, which catalogues some songs of Irving Berlin without catalyzing that gentleman's career. And with Fred Astaire and Bing Crosby as its bright particular stars, everyone's probity is honored by it—especially Mr. Berlin's."

=== Accolades ===
At the 19th Academy Awards, Blue Skies received two nominations: Best Music (Scoring of a Musical Picture) for Robert Emmett Dolan and Best Music (Song) for "You Keep Coming Back Like a Song", music and lyrics by Irving Berlin.

== Soundtrack and dance routines ==
Crosby applies his famous relaxed crooning style to the many songs he delivers here. In contrast, Astaire, assisted by choreographers Hermes Pan and Dave Robel (for the "Puttin' On the Ritz" routine), delivers a series of dances which explore the theme of confrontation, both with partners and with the audience. As a result, it is one of only a few Astaire films not to feature a romantic-partnered dance.

- "A Pretty Girl Is Like a Melody": Berlin's 1919 song is presented as part of a big Ziegfeld Follies production number, an aesthetic which Astaire parodies in this partnered dance with Caulfield and others. In the first of a series of references to films he made earlier in the 1940s, he reprises a tap sequence performed atop a bar counter in the "One for My Baby" number from The Sky's the Limit (1943), this time danced down a stairway.
- "I've Got My Captain Working for Me Now": This song, composed in 1919, is performed by Crosby, backed up by Billy De Wolfe.
- "You'd Be Surprised": Another 1919 song, this time performed by Olga San Juan.
- "All by Myself": Crosby performs this 1921 song to Caulfield, who harmonizes with him in the closing phrases.
- "Serenade to an Old-Fashioned Girl": Caulfield sings this number, specially written for the film.
- "Puttin' On the Ritz": Although Berlin's 1930 song was originally written for vaudevillian Harry Richman, it has become indelibly associated with Astaire, who also recorded it for Columbia in 1930. In this tap solo with cane, which was widely billed as "Astaire's last dance", the lyrics are updated, replacing references to ritzy Harlemites with wealthy whites strutting their stuff up and down Park Avenue. The routine was produced after the rest of the film had been completed, and according to Astaire, it took "five weeks of back-breaking physical work" to prepare. It is constructed in three sections, beginning in a book-lined office with Astaire dressed in a morning suit. Here Astaire delivers the song while executing a gentle tap and cane solo in mock slow-motion, in an amusing parody of his impending retirement. The song finished, he returns to dancing at normal speed and dances around the office while executing an ingenious jumping cane routine, which relied on a concealed floor trigger mechanism. Rejuvenated, Astaire sweeps aside a pair of drab curtains to reveal a chorus of nine Fred Astaires – achieved by filming three separate versions of Astaire and interleaving them. The final section of the number is a repeat of the tune with a greatly reduced tempo, which accompanies a complex routine for Astaire and chorus. In "Top Hat, White Tie and Tails" from Top Hat (1935), Astaire pretended to machine-gun his chorus dancers with his cane and loud taps. This time, Astaire joins his chorus in adopting a confrontational, at times almost menacing posture towards his audience. In 1957, on the brink of yet another temporary retirement, Astaire wittily refers back to this routine in the self-parodying "The Ritz, Roll and Rock" number from Silk Stockings.
- "(I'll See You In) C-U-B-A": A 1920 song performed as a duet by Crosby and San Juan.
- "A Couple of Song and Dance Men": A comic song and dance duet for Astaire and Crosby to a number specially composed for the film. The concept is a reworking of the "I'll Capture Your Heart" number from Holiday Inn (1942) and the comedy centres on Crosby's legendary reluctance to rehearse.
- "You Keep Coming Back Like a Song": Crosby performs this specially composed number.
- "Blue Skies": Crosby sings this 1926 ballad, the film's title song, to Caulfield.
- "Nightclub Montage": Crosby performs fragments of "The Little Things In Life" (1930), "Not for All the Rice in China" (1933) and "Russian Lullaby" (1927).
- "Everybody Step": Crosby sings this 1921 number, followed by a brief dance for chorus choreographed by Hermes Pan. Crosby directs the chorus in the opening stages, a concept revived and further developed by Pan for the opening number of An Evening with Fred Astaire (1958).
- "How Deep Is the Ocean?": Crosby performs this 1932 song in a musing style, backed by a female quartet.
- "(Running Around In Circles) Getting Nowhere": Crosby sings this specially composed song to his daughter, played by Karolyn Grimes.
- "Heat Wave": The film's major production number features Astaire, Olga San Juan and chorus in a brightly coloured Latin-themed setting. It begins with San Juan's rendition – with the lyric "making her seat wave" toned down to "making her feet wave" – of this 1933 song, while Astaire approaches warily, using dance steps reminiscent of those used in the "Dream Ballet" number from Yolanda and the Thief (1945), followed by a partnered dance for Astaire and San Juan, and then a tap solo section for Astaire who quotes from the "Boogie Barcarolle (Rehearsal Sequence)" number from You'll Never Get Rich (1941). This solo section was shot in one take and features music specially composed by Astaire, the only time his music was used in a film. In a counterpoint to the film's opening number, this number ends with him ascending a staircase, only to fall dramatically from a precipice, ending his character's dance career.
- "Wartime Medley": Crosby performs excerpts from "Any Bonds Today" (1941), "This Is The Army, Mr. Jones" (1942) and "White Christmas" (1942) – which he had introduced in his previous film with Astaire: Holiday Inn (1942).
- "You Keep Coming Back Like a Song/Blue Skies (reprise)": Performed by Crosby and Caulfield at the film's close.

The other Berlin songs which featured only as background music in the film are, in order of use: "Tell Me Little Gypsy" (1920), "Nobody Knows" (1920), "Mandy" (1918), "I Wonder" (1919), "Some Sunny Day" (1922), "When You Walked Out Someone Else Walked In" (1923), "Because I Love You" (1926), "Homesick" (1922), "How Many Times" (1926), "The Song Is Ended" (1927), "Lazy" (1924), "Always" (1925) and "I Can't Remember" (1933).

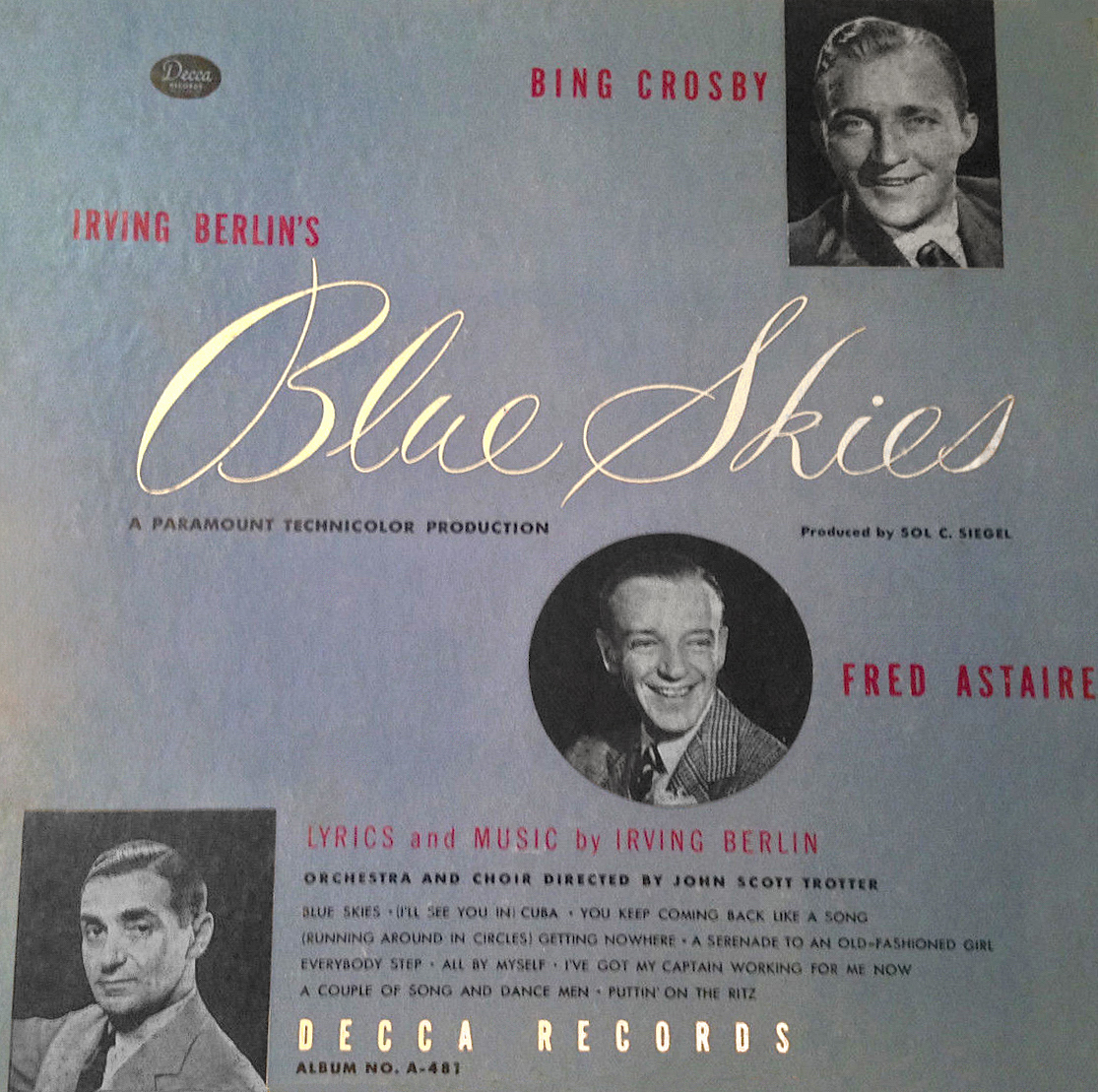
Blue Skies (Decca Records 1946)

Other Irving Berlin sings which were recorded by Bing Crosby for the film soundtrack but omitted from the released print were "Say It Isn't So", "What'll I Do", "All Alone", "Remember", "I'm Putting All My Eggs in One Basket", "Cheek to Cheek" and "God Bless America".

Bing Crosby recorded many of the songs for Decca Records. and these were also issued as a 5-disc, 78 rpm album titled Blue Skies (Decca album). "You Keep Coming Back Like a Song" was in the Billboard charts for six weeks with a peak position of #12. Crosby's songs were also included in the Bing's Hollywood series.
