= Blue Skies (Decca album) =

Blue Skies: A Paramount Technicolor Production
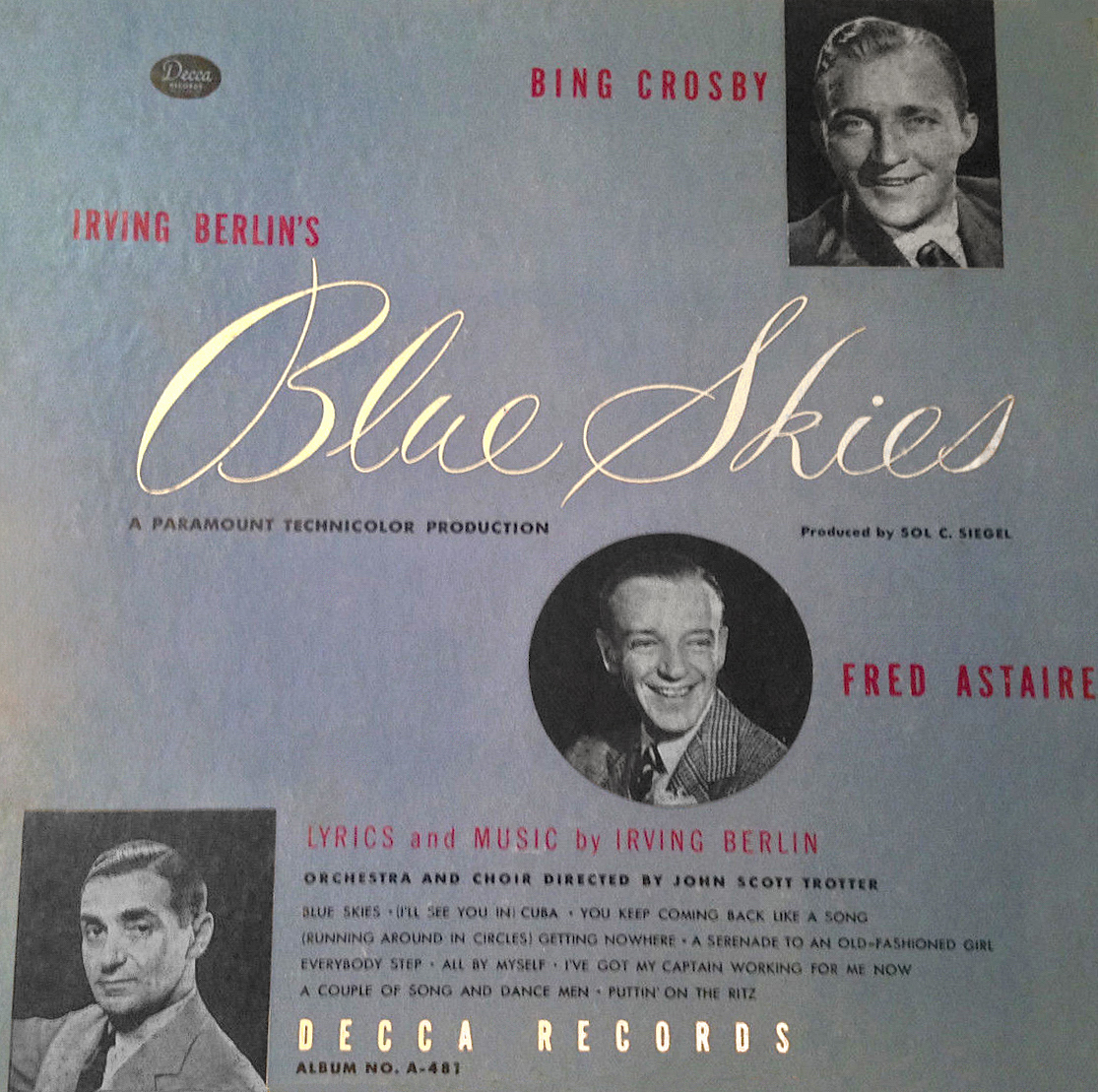

Studio album by Bing Crosby, Fred Astaire and Irving Berlin
- Released: 1946 (original 78 rpm album); 1949 (original LP album)
- Recorded: 1946
- Genre: Popular
- Length: 27:09 (original 78 rpm album); 21:41 (original LP album)
- Label: Decca

Bing Crosby chronology
Favorite Hawaiian Songs, Vol. Two (1946)	Blue Skies: A Paramount Technicolor Production (1946)	Bing Crosby – Jerome Kern (1946)

Fred Astaire chronology
Song Hits from Holiday Inn (1942)	Blue Skies (1946)	Easter Parade (1949)

Professional ratings
Review scores
Source	Rating
Allmusic	4/5 stars

Blue Skies is an album of phonograph records by Bing Crosby and Fred Astaire released in 1946 featuring songs that were presented in the American musical film Blue Skies. Like Song Hits from Holiday Inn, the entire 78 rpm album would be composed of Irving Berlin songs written specifically for the film. This was the first release of one of Astaire's greatest songs, "Puttin' On the Ritz", on shellac disc record.

== Reception ==
Down Beat magazine liked it:

Don't miss this show album. Any of the complete score albums that Decca turns out have rotten tunes thrown in with the good. This one is no exception - but it does have Crosby, and Astaire in what may very well be his last wax appearance. Astaire may be no singer, but even on wax, his personality comes through.

The album quickly entered Billboard's album charts reaching the No. 2 spot and was also ranked No. 20 of the top selling popular record albums for 1947.

== Track listing ==
These newly issued songs were featured on a 5-disc, 78 rpm album set Decca Album No. A-481. The first four discs are sung by Bing Crosby, while the last disc has Bing Crosby and Fred Astaire dueting on "A Couple of Song and Dance Men" and Astaire soloing on "Puttin' On the Ritz". All music and lyrics by Irving Berlin.

Side / Title	Recording date	Performed with	Time
Disc 1 (23646):
A. "Blue Skies"	July 18, 1946	John Scott Trotter and His Orchestra	3:23
B. "(I'll See You in) C-U-B-A"	July 24, 1946	Trudy Erwin and John Scott Trotter and His Orchestra	3:06
Disc 2 (23647):
A. "You Keep Coming Back Like a Song"	July 18, 1946	John Scott Trotter and His Orchestra	2:50
B. "(Running Around in Circles) Getting Nowhere"	July 18, 1946	John Scott Trotter and His Orchestra	2:07
Disc 3 (23648):
A. "A Serenade to an Old-Fashioned Girl"	July 18, 1946	John Scott Trotter and His Orchestra	3:03
B. "Everybody Step"	July 18, 1946	John Scott Trotter and His Orchestra	2:25
Disc 4 (23649):
A. "All by Myself"	July 18, 1946	John Scott Trotter and His Orchestra	3:14
B. "I've Got My Captain Working for Me Now"	July 24, 1946	John Scott Trotter and His Orchestra	2:34
Disc 5 (23650):
A. "A Couple of Song and Dance Men"	July 24, 1946	John Scott Trotter and His Orchestra	2:17
B. "Puttin' On the Ritz"	July 24, 1946	John Scott Trotter and His Orchestra	2:10

== LP release ==
Eight of the songs were included on the Decca 10-inch LP Irving Berlin's "Blue Skies" (DL 5042) issued in 1949. The omissions were "A Serenade to an Old-Fashioned Girl" and "Everybody Step".

Side one

1. Blue Skies"
2. "(I'll See You In) C-U-B-A"
3. "You Keep Coming Back Like a Song"
4. "Getting Nowhere"

Side two

1. "All By Myself"
2. "I've Got My Captain Working for Me Now"
3. "A Couple of Song and Dance Men"
4. "Puttin' On the Ritz"
