= From the Candy Store on the Corner to the Chapel on the Hill =

"From the Candy Store on the Corner to the Chapel on the Hill" is a popular song by Bob Hilliard, published in 1956.

The recording by Tony Bennett and Lois Winter was released by Columbia Records as catalog number 40726. It first reached the Billboard magazine charts on August 18, 1956 and lasted 12 weeks on the chart. On the Disk Jockey chart, it peaked at number 11; on the composite chart of the top 100 songs, it reached number 33. The flip side, "Happiness Street (Corner Sunshine Square)" was also a charted hit, so this was a two-sided hit.
