= All by Myself (Irving Berlin song) =

1921 popular song written by Irving Berlin

Song
- Genre: Jazz
- Songwriter: Irving Berlin

Audio sample
- Recording of All by Myself, performed by Aileen Stanley (1921): file; help

"All by Myself" is a popular song written by Irving Berlin, published in 1921.

It was introduced in The Music Box Revue of 1922. Popular recordings in 1921 were by Ted Lewis, Frank Crumit, Aileen Stanley, Benny Krueger's Orchestra, Vaughn De Leath and by Ben Selvin (vocal by Ernest Hare).

== Other notable recordings ==
- Marion Harris (1921)
- All Star Trio (1921)
- Bob Crosby's Bobcats, recorded February 6, 1940 (Decca 3248A) with vocal chorus by Marion Mann
- Bing Crosby, recorded July 18, 1946 with John Scott Trotter and His Orchestra and included on the Decca album Blue Skies
- The Skyrockets Orchestra, Conductor: Paul Fenoulhet with vocal by Doreen Lundy. Recorded in London on November 14, 1946. It was released by EMI on the His Master's Voice label (catalogue number BD 5955).
- Steve Conway, released as a single by Columbia in Britain in 1947
- Frankie Masters (1947)
- Pat Boone - for his album Pat Boone Sings Irving Berlin (1957).
- Connee Boswell - for her album Connee Boswell Sings Irving Berlin - A Golden Anniversary Tribute (1958).
- Ella Fitzgerald - Ella Fitzgerald Sings the Irving Berlin Songbook (1958)
- Connie Francis - The Exciting Connie Francis (1959)
- Kay Starr - included in her album Kay Starr: Jazz Singer (1960).
- Bobby Darin, included in his album Oh! Look at Me Now (1962)
- Nat King Cole - for his album Dear Lonely Hearts (1962)
- Brenda Lee - included in her album All Alone Am I (1962)
- Sue Raney - All by Myself (1964).
- Della Reese - Moody (1965).
- Nancy Sinatra - for her album Sugar (1966)
- Teresa Brewer - American Music Box, Vol. 1 (Songs of Irving Berlin) (1987).
- Martha Wainwright - Boardwalk Empire Volume 1: Music from the HBO Original Series (2011)

== Performances on film ==
Part of the song is sung by Betty Boop (Mae Questel) in the 1933 animated short film Is My Palm Read.

It was performed by Bing Crosby and Joan Caulfield (dubbed by Betty Russell) in the 1946 film Blue Skies.

== Notable live radio performances ==
Crosby also performed it alongside Al Jolson. This performance was broadcast live on Crosby's radio show on May 7, 1947.
