= Happiness Street (Corner Sunshine Square) =

"Happiness Street (Corner Sunshine Square)" is a popular song written by Edward White and Mack Wolfson and published in 1955.

The recording by Georgia Gibbs was released by Mercury Records as catalog number 70920. It first reached the Billboard magazine charts on August 25, 1956 and lasted eight weeks on the chart. On the Disk Jockey chart, it peaked at number 20; on the composite chart of the top 100 songs, it reached number 25.

The recording by Tony Bennett was released by Columbia Records as catalog number 40726. It first reached the Billboard magazine charts on October 6, 1956 and lasted two weeks on the chart. On the composite chart of the top 100 songs, it reached number 38. The flip side was a bigger hit, "From the Candy Store on the Corner to the Chapel on the Hill," making this record a two-sided hit.
