= The Road to Hong Kong (soundtrack) =

The Road to Hong Kong: Original Soundtrack Album

Soundtrack album by Bing Crosby
- Released: 1962
- Recorded: 1962
- Genre: Soundtrack, vocal
- Length: 31:54
- Label: Liberty

Bing Crosby chronology
My Golden Favorites (1961)	The Road to Hong Kong: Original Soundtrack Album (1962)	Bing's Hollywood (set of 15 albums) (1962)

The Road to Hong Kong is a 1962 soundtrack album issued by Liberty Records (No. LOM 16002) from the film of the same name. The film starred Bing Crosby, Bob Hope, Joan Collins and Robert Morley with cameos from Frank Sinatra, Dean Martin, Dorothy Lamour, Peter Sellers and David Niven. Robert Farnon conducted the music for the film. All the songs were written by Jimmy Van Heusen (music) and Sammy Cahn (lyrics). Robert Farnon wrote four orchestral pieces for the soundtrack and these are annotated in the listing.

Bing’s love ballad – “Let’s Not Be Sensible” includes a few lines from Joan Collins and in the film there is an abrupt interruption which curtails the song as Bing is about to sing “love”. The tracks for the film would probably have been recorded in September 1961 and one assumes a full version would have been laid down of “Let’s Not Be Sensible” prior to its subsequent editing. However, it seems that the original track was mislaid or erased and Bing had already returned to the USA by the time the LP was being prepared. The producer of the LP and the complementary single had no choice but to try to use the version employed in the film even though the ending was missing. The solution was to bring in Mike Sammes, a well known vocal arranger and backing singer, to sing the word “love”.

The entire album was included in the Sepia Records CD "The Road to Hong Kong / Say One for Me" (Sepia 1216) issued in 2013.

== Reception ==
The film itself was well received and so was the album. Variety said:

Sammy Cahn and Jimmy Van Heusen, a couple of pic pros, have whipped up a serviceable score for the latest Bing Crosby-Bob Hope-Dorothy Lamour “Road” film. It comes over as highly pleasing soundtrack set that should get a good sales runoff with the pic’s playing dates. The set was done in England with Robert Farnon conducting the orch but the values are pegged primarily for the US market. In the song spotlight are the Crosby-Hope duet on “Team Work”, Crosby’s balladeering on “Let’s Not Be Sensible” and Miss Lamour’s “Warmer than a Whisper”. In all, the package is loaded with a marquee pull and a bright spirit that’s hard to beat.

== Track listing ==
Side one
No.	Title	Lyrics	Music	Performer(s)	Length
1.	"Overture"	Sammy Cahn	Jimmy Van Heusen	Robert Farnon & Orchestra	2:44
2.	"Team Work"	Cahn	Van Heusen	Bing Crosby & Bob Hope	2:12
3.	"Reluctant Astronauts"	̶	Farnon	Robert Farnon & Orchestra	3:10
4.	"Warmer Than a Whisper"	Cahn	Van Heusen	Dorothy Lamour	3:04
5.	"The Only Way to Travel"	Cahn	Van Heusen	Robert Farnon & Orchestra	2:28
6.	"Let's Not Be Sensible Blues"	Cahn	Van Heusen	Robert Farnon & Orchestra	2:33

Side two
No.	Title	Lyrics	Music	Performer(s)	Length
1.	"The Road to Hong Kong"	Cahn	Van Heusen	Bing Crosby & Bob Hope	3:06
2.	"Let's Not Be Sensible"	Cahn	Van Heusen	Bing Crosby & Joan Collins	2:35
3.	"Lamasery Chant"	̶	Farnon	Robert Farnon & Orchestra	3:56
4.	"Moon over Hong Kong"	̶	Farnon	Robert Farnon & Orchestra	3:35
5.	"The Chase"	̶	Farnon	Robert Farnon & Orchestra	2:31
