= Georgia Gibbs =

American jazz and pop singer (1919–2006)

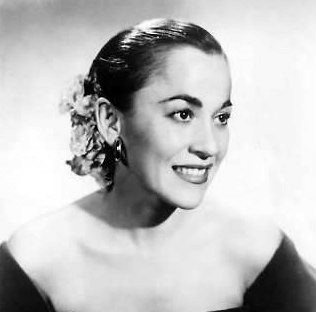

Background information
- Born: Frieda Lipschitz; August 17, 1919; Worcester, Massachusetts, U.S.
- Died: December 9, 2006 (aged 87) New York City, U.S.
- Years active: 1936–1966

Georgia Gibbs (born Frieda Lipschitz; August 17, 1919 – December 9, 2006) was an American popular singer and vocal entertainer rooted in jazz. Already singing publicly in her early teens, Gibbs achieved acclaim and notoriety in the mid-1950s copying songs originating with the black rhythm and blues community and later became a featured vocalist for many radio and television variety and comedy programs. Her key attribute was tremendous versatility and an uncommon stylistic range from melancholy ballad to uptempo swinging jazz and rock and roll.

== Early life ==
Gibbs was born in Worcester, Massachusetts, the youngest of four children of Russian Jewish descent. Her father died when she was six months old, and she and her three siblings spent the next seven years in a local Jewish orphanage.

Revealing a natural talent for singing at a young age, Frieda was given the lead in the orphanage's yearly variety show. When her mother, who had visited her every other month, found employment as a midwife, she came back for Frieda, but her job often forced her to leave her daughter for weeks at a time with only a Philco radio for company.

== Career ==
While still in Worcester at age 13, Frieda auditioned for a job at the Plymouth Theatre, one of the prime vaudeville houses in Boston. The Plymouth's manager had already heard her sing on the local Worcester radio station, and Gibbs was hired and moved to Boston, eventually landing at the Raymor Ballroom. She joined the Hudson-DeLange Orchestra in 1936 (age 17), and toured with them for 10 months as Fredda Gibson. "You don't really know loneliness unless you do a year or two with a one-night band", Gibbs said of her life on the big-band circuit, "Sing until about 2 a.m. Get in a bus and drive 400 miles. Stop in the night for the greasy hamburger. Arrive in a town. Try to sleep. Get up and eat."

She found steady work on radio shows including Your Hit Parade, Melody Puzzles, and The Tim And Irene Show and freelanced in the late 1930s and early 1940s singing with the bands of Tommy Dorsey, Hal Kemp, Artie Shaw, and Frankie Trumbauer. While a Billboard article reports that her first time on disk was with Trumbauer's orchestra ("The Laziest Gal in Town" on Brunswick Records), liner notes from a 1998 Simitar compilation report her appearance on some of DeLange's recordings on Brunswick, and a recording exists with Hal Kemp from 1939. She first charted with Shaw's band in 1942 on "Absent Minded Moon" (Victor 27779), which received a lukewarm review at the time. Gibbs was the first singer to record "The Laziest Gal in Town", a Cole Porter song which was made much more famous in the 1960s by Nina Simone.

In 1943, with her name changed to Georgia Gibbs, she began appearing on the Camel Caravan radio program, hosted by Jimmy Durante and Garry Moore, where she remained a regular performer until 1947. It was Moore who bestowed upon her the famous nickname "Her Nibs, Miss Georgia Gibbs," ironically using the title to describe the singer of diminutive stature who had an enormous "authoritative" prominence in American pop music.

Gibbs signed with Majestic Records in 1946 cutting multiple records including the first of three recordings of Ballin' The Jack (she re-recorded the song in 1950 and 1954). but her first solo hit single, "If I Knew You Were Comin' I'd've Baked a Cake" (on the Coral label) did not come until 1950. The recording got airplay but the disc failed to sell anything. During this period she also was the featured vocalist on tours with comedians Danny Kaye and Sid Caesar. Success as a singer outside of radio and variety shows continued to elude her, as noted in a 1952 Time article:

"Georgia", they kept telling her, "you gotta get a sound." Musical soothsayers were trying to get Songstress Georgia Gibbs into line with the latest fashion. Perhaps, they thought, she should sing mechanized duets with herself (like Patti Page), or she might try an echo chamber background (like Peggy Lee). But gimmicks were not Georgia Gibbs's cup of tea. She had a big, old-fashioned voice, a good ear, a vivacious personality, and she knew how to sing from the shoulder. She would stick with plain Georgia Gibbs.

Through 1949 and 1950 she appeared on TV shows Cavalcade of Stars and All Star Revue. In 1951 she signed with Mercury Records, where she ultimately had success "sticking with plain Georgia Gibbs". Possessed of a versatile voice, she cut a long list of well-received records in every category from torch songs to rock-and-roll, jazz, swing, old fashioned ballads and cha-chas. The most successful, 1952's "Kiss Of Fire", which she performed on The Milton Berle Show in that spring, reached No. 1 on the pop music chart. The disc sold in excess of one million copies, giving Gibbs her first gold disc. "Kiss of Fire" borrows the tune of the tango El Choclo by Ángel Villoldo, and the lyrics, arrangement and delivery communicate passion on a Wagnerian scale.

Like many singers, Gibbs preferred ballads, as there was more opportunity to showcase her vocal abilities, although she became mostly associated with uptempo novelty songs. Some ballads she cut included "My Melancholy Baby", "I'll Be Seeing You", "Autumn Leaves", and "You Keep Coming Back Like a Song". Yet she could also belt out fast jazz numbers like "Red Hot Mama" and "A-Razz-A-Ma-Tazz", jive with tunes like "Ol Man Mose" and "Shoo-Shoo Baby", or rock out with "I Want You to Be My Baby". Her Swingin' With Her Nibs album (1956) demonstrated her natural affinity for improvisation as well.

In 1957, Gibbs signed with RCA Victor, going on to chart with over 40 songs before retirement from singing, and was briefly successful doing rock 'n' roll songs as well. Her Mercury record "Silent Lips" was a big hit in Sweden (September 1958-March 1959) peaking at number 5 in the best-selling charts, and there were even several Swedish cover versions of that song, "Ingenting" by among others Towa Carson, Lill-Babs and[Britt Rylander. Also "The Hula Hoop Song" did well in Sweden (February–March 1959) peaking at number 12. She continued to appear on many television shows including The Ed Sullivan Show. She also hosted a show of her own, Georgia Gibbs and Her Million Record Show, which ran on NBC from July 1 to September 2, 1957. She cut her final album, Call Me, in 1966 and rarely performed after that.

Some notoriety followed Gibbs for her cover versions of music popularized by black performers, such as Etta James's "The Wallflower" (recorded by Gibbs with bowdlerized lyrics under the title "Dance With Me Henry", released March 26, 1955) and her copycat cover of LaVern Baker's "Tweedle Dee" (which outsold Baker's version, prompting complaint from her). Decades later, Gibbs commented that she, like most artists of the day, had no say in their choice of material and arrangements. A widely told story has LaVern Baker taking out a life insurance policy on herself in advance of a flight to Australia and naming Georgia Gibbs as the beneficiary. "You need this more than I do," Baker is said to have written to Gibbs, "because if anything happens to me, you're out of business." Whitened pop covers of black R&B and blues songs were a mid-1950s fad and many singers and groups had hits with them, including Pat Boone, the McGuire Sisters, the Chordettes, and the Crew Cuts.

== Personal life ==
In 1970 she married foreign correspondent and author Frank Gervasi, biographer of Israeli prime minister Menachem Begin, and whose books include To Whom Palestine?, The Case for Israel, The Real Rockefeller and The Violent Decade. They had first met in Paris in the 1930s, but lost touch with one another for 12 years. The marriage lasted until his death in 1990; they had one child who predeceased Georgia.

Georgia Gibbs died of leukemia on December 9, 2006, aged 87, at New York's Memorial Sloan-Kettering Cancer Center. Survivors included grandson Sacha Gervasi (from her husband's previous marriage), her brother Robert Gibson and nieces Patty Turk, Jody (Babydoll) Gibson, and Jody's sister Amy. Gibbs' last interview, conducted by Greg Adams, was subsequently published online.

== Legacy ==
Interest in Gibbs' work has enjoyed a revival with the re-issue on CD of long unavailable material. In her 2006 book, Great Pretenders: My Strange Love Affair With 50s Pop Music, Newsweek music critic Karen Schoemer wrote: "What really turned me around, though, were her R&B covers... Georgia was the rare fifties canary with a genuine flair for rock and roll... by the time I was through listening... I had a healthy new respect for Georgia, and a sense of indignation over her neglect by critics."

== Singles ==
Year	Single (A-side, B-side) Both sides from same album except where indicated	Chart positions				Album
Year	Single (A-side, B-side) Both sides from same album except where indicated	US	CB	US AC	UK	Album
1947	"You Do" b/w "Feudin' and Fightin'"	—	—	—	—	Non-album tracks
1950	"If I Knew You Were Comin' (I'd've Baked A Cake)" b/w "Stay With the Happy People" (Non-album track)	5	—	—	—	Her Nibs (Coral)
1950	"Simple Melody" b/w "A Little Bit Independent"; Both tracks with Bob Crosby	25	—	—	—	Non-album tracks
1950	"Cherry Stones" b/w "Dream A Little Dream Of Me"; Both sides with Bob Crosby	—	—	—	—	Non-album tracks
1950	"Red Hot Mama" b/w "Razz-A-Ma-Tazz"	—	—	—	—	Her Nibs (Coral)
1951	"I Still Feel The Same About You" b/w "Get Out Those Old Records"	18	—	—	—	Her Nibs (Coral)
1951	"Cherry Pink and Apple Blossom White" b/w "Get Him Off My Hands"	—	—	—	—	Non-album tracks
1951	"Tom's Tune" b/w "I Wish, I Wish"	21	—	—	—	Non-album tracks
1951	"Good Morning, Mr. Echo" b/w "Be Doggone Sure You Call"	21	—	—	—	Non-album tracks
1951	"While You Danced, Danced, Danced" b/w "While We're Young"	6	—	—	—	Non-album tracks
1951	"Cry" b/w "My Old Flame"	24	—	—	—	Non-album tracks
1952	"Kiss of Fire" b/w "A Lasting Thing"	1	—	—	—	Non-album tracks
1952	"So Madly In Love" b/w "Make Me Love You"	21	22	—	—	Non-album tracks
1952	"Sinner or Saint" /	—	28	—	—	Non-album tracks
1952	"My Favorite Song"	22	12	—	—	Non-album tracks
1952	"A Moth and A Flame" b/w "The Photograph On The Piano"	—	—	—	—	Non-album tracks
1953	"What Does It Mean To Be Lonely" b/w "Winter's Here Again"	—	—	—	—	Non-album tracks
1953	"Seven Lonely Days" b/w "If You Take My Heart Away"	5	9	—	—	Song Favorites Of Georgia Gibbs
1953	"For Me, For You" /	21	—	—	—	Non-album tracks
1953	"Thunder and Lightning"	—	20	—	—	Non-album tracks
1953	"Say It Isn't So" b/w "He's Funny That Way"	—	—	—	—	Music and Memories
1953	"The Bridge Of Sighs" /	30	—	—	—	Non-album tracks
1953	"A Home Lovin' Man"	30	—	—	—	Non-album tracks
1953	"Under Paris Skies" b/w "I Love Paris"	—	—	—	—	Non-album tracks
1954	"Somebody Bad Stole De Wedding Bell" b/w "Baubles, Bangles and Beads"	18	15	—	—	Non-album tracks
1954	"My Sin" b/w "I'll Always Be Happy With You" (Non-album tracks)	21	27	—	—	Song Favorites Of Georgia Gibbs
1954	"Wait For Me, Darling" b/w "Whistle and I'll Dance"	24	32	—	—	Non-album tracks
1954	"The Man That Got Away" b/w "More Than Ever" (Non-album track)	—	—	—	—	Music and Memories
1954	"Mambo Baby" b/w "Love Me" (Non-album track)	—	41	—	—	Song Favorites Of Georgia Gibbs
1955	"Tweedle Dee" b/w "You're Wrong, All Wrong" (Non-album track)	2	3	—	20	Song Favorites Of Georgia Gibbs
1955	"Dance With Me Henry (Wallflower)"; Original B-side: "Ballin' The Jack"; Later B-side: "Every Road Must Have A Turning"	1	3	—	—	Song Favorites Of Georgia Gibbs
1955	"Sweet and Gentle" /	12	8	—	—	Song Favorites Of Georgia Gibbs
1955	"Blueberries"	—	45	—	—	Song Favorites Of Georgia Gibbs
1955	"I Want You To Be My Baby" b/w "Come Rain or Come Shine" (Non-album track)	14	13	—	—	Song Favorites Of Georgia Gibbs
1955	"Goodbye To Rome (Arrivederci Roma)" /	51	44	—	—	Non-album tracks
1955	"24 Hours a Day (365 A Year)"	74	36	—	—	Non-album tracks
1956	"Rock Right" b/w "The Greatest Thing"	36	37	—	—	Non-album tracks
1956	"Kiss Me Another" b/w "Fool Of The Year"	30	27	—	24	Non-album tracks
1956	"Happiness Street" b/w "Happiness Is A Thing Called Joe" (from Swinging With Her Nibs	20	30	—	—	Non-album tracks
1956	"Tra La La" b/w "Morning, Noon and Night"	24	36	—	—	Non-album tracks
1957	"Silent Lips" b/w "Pretty Pretty"	68	50	—	—	Non-album tracks
1957	"The Sheik Of Araby" b/w "I Am A Heart, A Heart, A Heart"	—	—	—	—	Non-album tracks
1957	"I'm Walking The Floor Over You" b/w "Sugar Candy"	92	—	—	—	Non-album tracks
1957	"Fun Lovin' Baby" b/w "I Never Had The Blues"	—	—	—	—	Non-album tracks
1957	"I Miss You" b/w "Great Balls of Fire"	—	—	—	—	Non-album tracks
1958	"Way Way Down" b/w "You're Doin' It"	—	—	—	—	Non-album tracks
1958	"Hello Happiness, Goodbye Blues" b/w "It's My Pleasure"	—	—	—	—	Non-album tracks
1958	"The Hula Hoop Song" b/w "Keep In Touch"	32	37	—	—	Non-album tracks
1959	"The Hucklebuck" b/w "Better Loved You'll Never Be"	—	—	—	—	Non-album tracks
1959	"Pretend" b/w "Hamburgers, Frankfurters and Potato Chips"	—	—	—	—	Non-album tracks
1960	"Seven Lonely Days" b/w "The Stroll That Stole My Heart"	—	—	—	—	Non-album tracks
1960	"So in Love" b/w "Loch Lomond"	—	—	—	—	Georgia Gibbs
1963	"Candy Kisses" b/w "I Will Follow You"	—	—	—	—	Georgia Gibbs' Greatest Hits
1963	"Tater Poon" b/w "Nine Girls Out Of Ten Girls"	—	—	—	—	Non-album tracks
1964	"You Can Never Get Away From Me" b/w "I Wouldn't Have It Any Other Way"	—	—	—	—	Call Me Georgia Gibbs
1965	"Let Me Cry On Your Shoulder"; Original B-side: "You Can Never Get Away From Me"; Later B-side: "Venice Blue (Que C'est Triste Venise)"	132	87	—	—	Call Me Georgia Gibbs
1965	"Call Me" b/w "Don't Cry Joe"	—	—	—	—	Call Me Georgia Gibbs
1966	"Let Me Dream" b/w "In Time"	—	—	37	—	Call Me Georgia Gibbs
1966	"Kiss Of Fire" b/w "Blue Grass"	—	—	—	—	Call Me Georgia Gibbs
1967	"Where's The Music Coming From" b/w "Time Will Tell"	—	—	—	—	Non-album tracks

== Selected records ==
- 1939: If It's Good (Then I Want It) (with Hal Kemp and his Orch.)
- 1940: The Laziest Gal In Town (as "Fredda Gibson") (with Frankie Trumbauer and his Orch.)
- 1942: Absent Minded Moon (with Artie Shaw's Orch.)
- 1944: Milkman, Keep Those Bottles Quiet (V-Disc with Tommy Dorsey's Orch.)
- 1946: Feudin' And Fightin', Ballin' The Jack (Majestic), Is It Worth It? (Orch. directed by Earle Hagen), Ol' Man Mose, Put Yourself In My Place Baby, Willow Road, You Keep Coming Back Like A Song
- 1947: Fool That I Am, How Are Things In Glocca Morra?, I Feel So Smootchie, Necessity, You Do (Orch. directed by Glenn Osser)
- 1948: The One I Love Belongs To Somebody Else, The Things We Did Last Summer, Wrap Your Troubles In Dreams
- 1950: A-Razz-A-Ma-Tazz, Ballin' The Jack (Coral), Cherry Stones (with Bob Crosby and The Mellomen, Orch. dir. by George Cates), Dream A Little Dream Of Me (with Bob Crosby and The Mellomen, Orch. dir. by George Cates), Get Out Those Old Records (with the Owen Bradley Sextet), I Don't Care If The Sun Don't Shine, I Was Dancing With Someone, I'll Get Myself A Choo Choo Train, I'll Know, A Little Bit Independent (with Bob Crosby), Looks Like A Cold Cold Winter, Red Hot Mama, Simple Melody (with Bob Crosby), Stay With The Happy People, Then I'll Be Happy
- 1951: Be Doggone Sure You Call, Be My Life's Companion (Orch. directed by Glenn Osser), Cherry Pink And Apple Blossom White, Cry, Good Morning Mister Echo, Got Him Off My Hands, I Still Feel The Same About You, I Wish I Wish (with Glenn Osser and his Orch.), My Old Flame, The Oklahoma Polka (Orch. and Chorus directed by Glenn Osser), Once Upon A Nickel, Shoo-Shoo Baby, Tom's Tune, What Does It Mean (Orch. directed by Glenn Osser), (Ooh-oo, Ooh-oo, Ooh-oo) What You Do To Me (Orch. directed by Glenn Osser), While We Danced, While We're Young, While You Danced Danced Danced
- 1951: Ballin' the Jack Her first 10" LP (Coral)
- 1952: Kiss Of Fire, A Lasting Thing, Make me Love You, A Moth And A Flame, My Favorite Song, The Photograph On The Piano, Sinner Or Saint, So Madly In Love, Winter's Here Again (Orch. directed by Glenn Osser)
- 1952: Sings with Earl Hagen's Orchestra (with Earl Hagen Orch.) Her first 12" LP (Allegro)
- 1953: Autumn Leaves, The Bridge Of Sighs, For Me For Me, He's Funny That Way, Home Lovin' Man, How Long Has This Been Going On, I Love Paris, If I Had You, If You Take My Heart Away (Orch. directed by Glenn Osser), I'll Always Be In Love With You, It Had To Be You, My Blue Heaven, Regret If You Can, Say It Isn't So, Seven Lonely Days, Somebody Loves Me, That's All, Thunder And Lightning (Orch. directed by Glenn Osser), What Does It Mean To Be Lonely
- 1954: After You've Gone, All Alone, Baby Won't You Please Come Home?, Baubles Bangles and Beads, Every Road Must Have A Turning (Orch. directed by Glenn Osser), How Did He Look, I'll Always Be Happy With You (Orch. directed by Glenn Osser), I'll Be Seeing You (Orch. directed by Glenn Osser), It's The Talk Of The Town, Love Me (Orch. directed by Glenn Osser), Mambo Baby, The Man That Got Away, Melancholy Baby, More Than Ever (Orch. directed by Glenn Osser), My Sin, Somebody Bad Stole De Wedding Bell, Tweedle Dee, Wait For Me Darling, What'll I Do, Whistle And I'll Dance, You're Wrong, All Wrong
- 1955: Blueberries (with Hugo Peretti and his Orch.), Come Rain or Come Shine, Dance With Me Henry, Goodbye To Rome (Arrivederci Roma), I Want You to Be My Baby, Kiss Me Another, Sweet And Gentle, 24 Hours A Day
- 1956: Comes Love, 'Deed I Do, Fool Of The Year (Orch. directed by Glenn Osser), The Greatest Thing (with Hugo Peretti and his Orch.), Happiness Is A Thing Called Joe, Happiness Street, I Get A Kick Out Of You, I Got It Bad (And That Ain't Good), Let's Do It (Let's Fall In Love), Lonesome Road, Morning Noon And Night (Orch. directed by Glenn Osser), On The Sunny Side Of The Street, One For My Baby, The One I Love (Belongs To Somebody Else), Pretty Pretty (Orch. directed by Glenn Osser), Rock Right, Silent Lips (Orch. directed by Glenn Osser), Tra La La (Orch. directed by Glenn Osser), Wrap Your Troubles In Dreams (And Dream Your Troubles Away), You've Got To See Mama Ev'ry Night
- 1957: Fun Lovin' Baby, Great Balls of Fire, Hello Happiness Goodbye Blues, I Am A Heart A Heart A Heart, I Never Had The Blues, I'll Miss You, I'm Walking The Floor Over You (with Joe Reisman and his Orch. and Chorus), It's My Pleasure, The Sheik of Araby, Sugar Candy (with Joe Reisman and his Orch. and Chorus)
- 1958: The Hula Hoop Song, Keep In Touch, Way Way Down, You're Doin' it
- 1959: Better Loved You'll Never Be, Hamburgers Frankfurters And Potato Chips, Pretend, The Hucklebuck
- 1960: Do It Again, Fin Jan, Hush-A-Bye, In Other Words, Last Night When We Were Young, Loch Lomond, So In Love, Something's Gotta Give, Stay Here With Me, Tammy, Willow Tit Willow
- 1963: Arrivederci Roma (Epic), Ballin' The Jack (on the Epic label), Baubles Bangles And Beads (Epic), Candy Kisses, Dance With Me Henry (Epic), How About Me, I Will Follow You, Kansas City, Kiss Of Fire (Epic), Nine Girls Out Of Ten Girls, Nobody's Asking Questions, Sugar Puff, Tater Poon, Tweedle Dee (Epic), When You're Smiling (The Whole World Smiles With You)
- 1965: Don't Cry Joe, I Wouldn't Have It Any Other Way, In Time, Let Me Dream, You Can Never Get Away From Me
- 1966: Blue Grass, Call Me, Kiss Of Fire '66, Let Me Cry On Your Shoulder, Mon Coeur A Tant De Peine Laisse-Moi Pleurer, Northern Soul, Venice Blue

== TV appearances ==
- American Bandstand
  - Guest - December 18, 1957 (1957)
- The Big Record
  - Herself - Patti Page (Host); Johnnie Ray; Erroll Garner (1957)
- The Cavalcade of Stars
  - Herself - Jackie Gleason; Art Carney (1951)
- Frankie Laine Time - Guest - Jack E. Leonard; Jerry Vale (1956)
- The Ed Sullivan Show
  - scheduled guest - The Sparkletones; Mills Brothers; Sammy Kaye (1957)
  - Herself - Gene Vincent & the Blue Caps; Carol Burnett (1957)
  - Herself - Everly Brothers; Sal Mineo; Teresa Brewer (1958)
  - scheduled guest - scheduled: Johnnie Ray; Jane Morgan; Ice Capades (1958)
  - scheduled guest - scheduled: Charlton Heston; Eartha Kitt (1959)
  - Herself - Fabian Forte; John Wayne (on tape) (1959)
  - Herself - Carol Channing; Wayne & Shuster (1959)
  - scheduled guest - scheduled: Suzanne Pleshette; Tom Poston (1959)
  - scheduled guest - scheduled: Red Buttons; Rowan & Martin (1960)
  - scheduled guest - Oscar Hammerstein tribute: Della Reese; Jill Corey (1960)
- The Ed Wynn Show
  - Herself - Ed Wynn; Buster Keaton; The Keystone Cops (1950)
- Four Star Revue
  - Herself - Ed Wynn; Eddie Cantor; Jack Carson; Jack Gilford; Bob Sweeney; Hal March; Spike Jones Orchestra (1951)
- The Garry Moore Show
  - Guest - December 2, 1958
- The Shower of Stars
  - guest star - Frankie Laine; Gene Austin; Gary Crosby; Red Skelton (1956)
  - guest star - Jack Benny; Yvonne De Carlo; Van Johnson (1957)
- The Steve Allen Show - guest star - Fats Domino; Steve Lawrence; Smith and Dale (1956)
- Toast of the Town
  - guest star - 1956 Ice Capades (1955)
  - Herself - scheduled: Eartha Kitt; Lionel Hampton; Phil Foster (1955)
  - Herself - Errol Flynn; Paulette Goddard (1952)
  - Herself - Bunny Briggs; Nancy Andrews (1949)
