= Princess Halliday =

Nigerian television personality and ethics professor

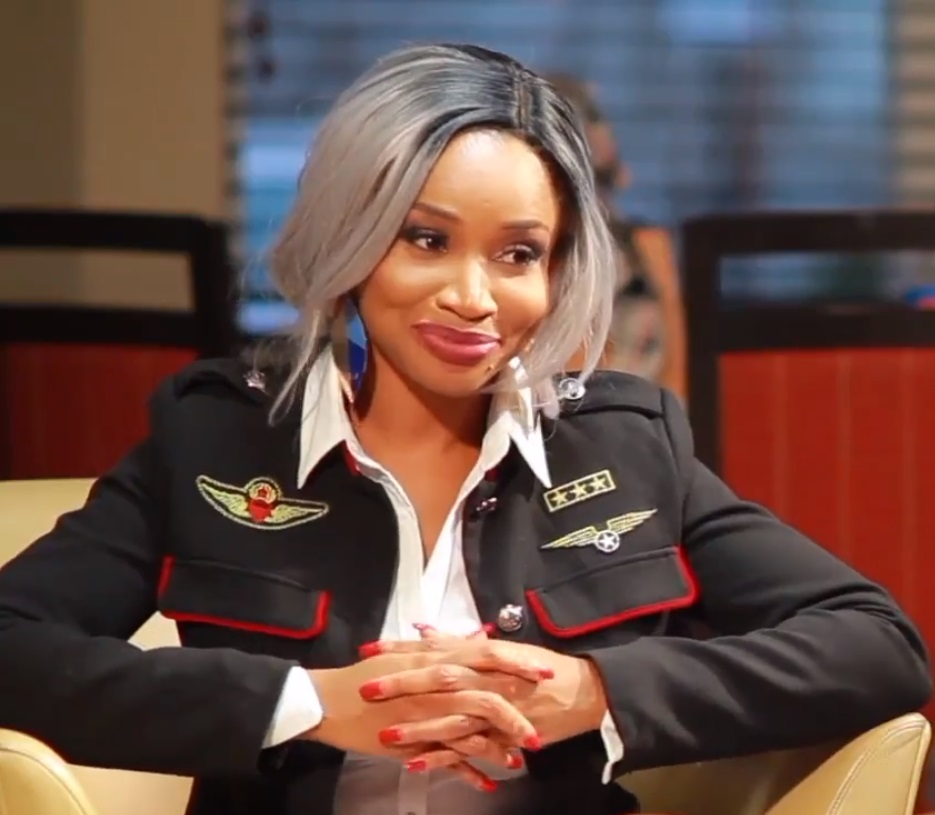
- Halliday on her program in 2017
- Born: Princess Halliday
- Education: Masters in Leadership; Leadership for Professionals in communication, Harvard University; Post graduate for Professionals - School of Business, Virginia Commonwealth University
- Occupations: Petroleum engineer; TV personality; Leadership ambassador; Harvard communication expert; Actress; Talk show host; Event host
- Years active: 1998 – present
- Known for: First young Nigerian to receive a degree in leadership that transcribes leading authentically
- Website: www.princesshalliday.com

Princess Halliday is a TV personality, professor of ethics, leadership ambassador, talk show host, trained petroleum engineer, communications expert, motivational speaker and occasional actress. She is the founder of the Empower Africa Initiative.

Halliday is the host and executive producer of The Princess Halliday Show, which airs on M-Net on the DSTV platform across 48 African countries. It is also syndicated across Nigeria on Silverbird Television, and in the UK on BEN TV.

== Early life ==
Halliday hails from Bonny Island in Rivers State, Nigeria; her mother is from the Halliday Awusa "King Halliday" House of the Kingdom of Bonny, making Halliday a princess by birth.

At the age of 3, she hosted her first radio talk show, Kiddies World and by the age of 14, she had held a number of roles at different companies. She enrolled into university at the age of 15 to become a Petroleum Engineer. She has worked in both upstream and downstream sectors of oil and gas.

Halliday, aside from speaking English, is fluent in Hindi, some French and Arabic.

== Career ==
This program presents to the world, individuals whom through tenacity and determination have accomplished something great and have been a catalyst for others to follow. The heart and soul of the show is ordinary people doing extraordinary things.

— Princess Halliday
(talking about her show The Princess Halliday Show)

=== Empower Africa Initiative ===
At age 19, Princess Halliday founded the Empower Africa Initiative whose mission is to positively enhance the mindset of the world by showcasing and engaging people, communities, and organizations, while empowering them to lead, innovate, and serve authentically. Halliday began producing her television show the Princess Halliday Show in collaboration with Multichoice Africa to be syndicated on M-Net via the DSTV network. The show has Halliday and her team travel across the world to showcase world leaders, global players, entrepreneurs, movie stars and ordinary people doing extraordinary things.

In 2012, Halliday after a visit to the Niger Delta area and taking note of the lack of structure in the water network, mobilized the Empower Africa Initiative in conjunction with the Niger Delta Development Commission of Nigeria to carry out the Reticulation of pipes in the Niger delta area, creating pipe borne water for several Niger delta communities.

Halliday is the first young Nigerian to properly strive to have a degree in Leadership that transcribes what it means to lead authentically. Princess Halliday desires to use her degree and expertise to change negative stereotypes of Africans where young women are not often believed to be leaders.

=== 2014 till date ===
In 2014, Halliday earned a leadership training from Harvard University known as "Communicating with Influence-The Art of Persuasion". She has a degree in Leadership from Woodbury University. Determined to revolutionize the understanding of leadership as Africa knows it, Halliday frequently strengthens the need for mindsets to be empowered.

Halliday hosted the 2014 Miss Commonwealth International Pageant in the UK. She also served Rivers State as a special media and image consultant to wife of the governor of Rivers State at the time, Dame Judith Amaechi.

Halliday along with women from Rivers State visited Morocco for the World Leaders Summit/Crans Montana Female Leadership Forum in Rabat, where she met the President of Malta, Marie-Louise Coleiro Preca, the youngest female to assume the office of the President, and her Chief of Staff John Camilleri.

For a very long time, women have been underrepresented in elite leadership roles with a mindset that systematically underestimates their own abilities. To see these phenomenal women doing extraordinarily in significant leadership positions and going beyond the perceived leadership labyrinth is Laudable.

— Princess Halliday

In 2015, the Princess Halliday show was renewed for another season, and she played host to a number of notable international guests including, American Christian contemporary singer Don Moen, Jamaican singer Chevelle Franklyn, former Nigerian Presidential candidate, Professor Pat Utomi, emmy nominated actress Amy Gibson, Hollywood actor from the movie "the perfect match" Rob Riley and a former Rivers State gubernatorial candidate Dakuku Peterside and many others. Halliday has also interviewed Nollywood actors, Mike Ezuruonye, Tonto Dikeh, Jim Iyke, Robert O. Peters, Joseph Benjamin, Raz Adoti, International singer Ron Kenoly, Nigeria megachurch pastor and church leader, Apostle Johnson Suleiman, the former Director-General of the Nigerian Maritime Administration and Safety Agency (NIMASA) Raymond Temisan Omatseye and many others on her show.

Halliday made her acting debut in 2015, in a TV series produced by Nollywood film-maker Obi Emelonye, titled The Calabash.

In July 2016, Empower Africa Initiative alongside Princess Halliday designed the merchandise theme "Empowered", designed to help prepare and guide all to their own empowered parity. Portions of proceeds from this design goes towards helping the underprivileged in Africa. The sales have garnered support from several celebrities and people of note.

=== Global speaking engagement ===
In December 2016, Halliday was invited to speak on corruption at the Parliament House of Commons London at the care of the MP Helen Grant (Maidstone & The Weald). The event was organized by Alistair Soyode, the owner of BEN TV with the focus on dealing with the issue of corruption in Africa.

Halliday is one of the designated speakers for the 2017 Nigeria-Agri Food Investment Forum 2017. Her focus was on addressing the seemingly increasing barriers to leadership, business and investment in Nigeria and proffering solutions through which this can be strengthened.

=== In 2017 leadership ===
In 2017, Halliday commenced working on the World African Women Leadership Conference, committed to ensuring women in leadership position are strengthened to lead authentically while ensuring young girls receive the educational opportunity, leadership development and mentoring support needed to be authentic leaders.

Princess Halliday spoke and addressed leaders at the Mackerel Business and Leadership conference in Virginia Commonwealth University on "How Authenticity Affects Leaders in Africa" She shared her beliefs that it is time for business leaders to begin to change their mindset from the conventional development mindset to a revolutionary and investment mindset.

=== World Bank Meeting Annual 2017 ===
"I am aware that people can hardly correlate a beautiful lady to leadership especially in our continent where young women are not believed to be carriers of great initiative. This has been a great challenge to me and so daily I endeavor to do the extraordinary. I strive to educate and empower men and women to identify their leadership parity and have young girls know that they have the capacity to be leaders and yes Beauty Equates to Leadership. I am a leader with my own style. Am I changing the dynamics of leadership? Yes I am and this is so important to me. We have had enough of the conventional stalled leadership that has existed for so long and very rarely worked. It is time for a revolution. You can be young, pretty, intelligent, do things the right way and be an Authentic Leader," she said.

She said, "Oftentimes, leaders talk about growth and giving opportunity to the young generation but in reality very few leaders want growth. Power gets intoxicating and so it becomes hard for them to let go. But the truth is great leaders extend the circle of influence so the most junior person feels like they belong. But one great challenge for Africa– one that has stalled her leadership – is how to convince 1.2 billion people to put aside competing interests, sideline different religions, leaderless uprising, ethnicity, political persuasions, and build a United Nation with Authentic leaders to truly bring about significant change."

=== Leadership style ===
As a guest lecturer at California State University, Northridge, it has been noted that Princess Halliday strives for women in Africa to get a sit at the table with a mission to develop ethical leaders with an ability to think critically and act effectively. She has constantly liaised with the women in position of authority in Africa, accentuating the need for embracing Empowered parity.

We must sit at the table, we must shift the paradigm and change the culture, we must understand that beauty equates to Leadership and young people ( boys and girls) are carriers of Great Initiative.

— Princess Halliday

== Personal life ==
Halliday currently lives in West Hollywood, California, in the United States, where, as of 2016, episodes of her television show were being taped.

== Awards and recognition ==
In recognition of her work in diverse fields, Halliday has received a number of laurels, including being recognized by the International Commonwealth platform in London, and she was given the award for the Youngest Executive Producer/TV Talk show Host in History.

The Canadian federal government recently honored Princess Halliday with the Outstanding Leadership award to Africa in London November 2016.
