= The Road to Hong Kong =

1962 British film by Norman Panama

- Theatrical release poster
- Directed by: Norman Panama
- Written by: Norman Panama; Melvin Frank
- Produced by: Melvin Frank
- Starring: Bing Crosby; Bob Hope; Joan Collins
- Cinematography: Jack Hildyard
- Edited by: Alan Osbigton
- Music by: Robert Farnon
- Production company: Melnor Films
- Distributed by: United Artists
- Release dates: 29 March 1962 (UK); 22 May 1962 (USA)
- Running time: 91 minutes
- Country: United Kingdom
- Language: English
- Budget: $2 million
- Box office: $2.6 million (US/Canada)

The Road to Hong Kong is a 1962 British semi-musical comedy film directed by Norman Panama and starring Bing Crosby and Bob Hope, as well as Joan Collins, with an extended cameo featuring Dorothy Lamour in the setting of Hong Kong under British Rule. This was the seventh and final installment in the Road to ... series and the only one made without the involvement of Paramount Pictures, though references to the others in the series are made in the film and shown in Maurice Binder's opening title sequence.

== Plot ==
The story is told in flashback as Diane explains to American Intelligence how transmissions from passengers picked up from a missile to the moon are by Americans rather than Russians.

Harry Turner and Chester Babcock are defrauding people in Calcutta by selling a "Do-it-yourself interplanetary flight kit" that ends up injuring Chester, giving him amnesia. An Indian doctor says the only way to cure Chester's amnesia is through the help of the monks in a lamasery in Tibet.

At the airport, Chester mistakenly picks up a suitcase with a marking designed to be a point of contact between agents of a SPECTRE-type spy organization called "The Third Echelon." Diane, a Third Echelon secret agent, is supposed to give Russian rocket fuel plans stolen by the Third Echelon to the man with the suitcase, who will take them to headquarters in British Hong Kong. She mistakes Chester for the contact.

In Tibet, the two make their way to the lamasery in Lost Horizon fashion. Not only do the lamas cure Chester, but they have a Tibetan tea leaf that gives super memory powers to those who consume it. Chester and Harry observe as great works of Western literature in the manner of Fahrenheit 451 are committed to memory; one giggling lama (David Niven) memorizes Lady Chatterley's Lover. The scheming Harry decides to steal a bottle to give Chester the power of photographic memory for lucrative nefarious purposes.

Returning to Calcutta, followed by Diane, Harry has Chester test the results of the memory herb by memorizing the rocket formula that Diane placed in Chester's coat. Not knowing what it is, Harry destroys it after Chester has successfully memorized it. Diane arrives too late, but after seeing Chester recite the formula, she offers them $25,000 to meet her in Hong Kong. On the way to Hong Kong, an agent of the High Lama replaces the stolen Tibetan herbs with a similar bottle containing ordinary tea leaves.

The Third Echelon is seeking the fuel for its own spacecraft with an underwater launching pad in Hong Kong. The goal is to be the first on the moon, where a base is to be established to launch nuclear weapons against Earth and to bring survivors under the agency's control.

With a Russian launch to the moon carrying two apes imminent, the Third Echelon, which was going to emulate the Soviet achievement, decides to gain respect at the United Nations by launching two human astronauts, Chester and Harry, instead of apes. The two are used as guinea pigs (and fed with bananas) to test the capabilities of the spacecraft and the effects of spaceflight upon humans. The mission is successful, with moonlight bringing back Chester's photographic memory.

Diane decides to leave the Third Echelon when she discovers that once her colleagues have extracted the final formula from Chester, they plan to dissect Chester and Harry to see the effects of space travel on their bodies. Diane helps the boys escape. They are pursued through Hong Kong, eventually leading Diane to the authorities. Chester and Harry happen to meet Dorothy Lamour at a nightclub where they are recaptured by the Third Echelon.

Chester, Harry and Diane all end up in a rocket bound for another planet. They think they're alone after landing, but they're not – Chester calls out, "The Italians!" as they are joined by Frank Sinatra and Dean Martin.

== Cast ==
- Bing Crosby as Harry Turner
- Bob Hope as Chester Babcock
- Joan Collins as Diane (3rd Echelon agent)
- Robert Morley as Leader of the 3rd Echelon
- Peter Sellers as Indian physician
- Walter Gotell as Dr. Zorbb (3rd Echelon scientist)
- Sir Felix Aylmer as Grand Lama
- Alan Gifford as American official
- Michele Mok as Mr. Ahso
- Katya Douglas as 3rd Echelon receptionist
- Roger Delgado as Jhinnah
- Robert Ayres as American official
- Peter Madden as Lama
- David Niven as Lady Chatterley's Lover lama
- Dave King as Restaurateur
- Mei Ling as Ming Toy
- Jacqueline Jones as Blonde at airport
- Yvonne Shima as Poon Soon
- Dorothy Lamour as Herself
- Bob Simmons as Third Echelon astronaut
- Nosher Powell as Third Echelon astronaut

== Production ==
Filming in England at Shepperton Studios, the regular Road picture stars Crosby and Hope returned for one last go, but the leading lady was now Joan Collins rather than Dorothy Lamour. Lamour did make a cameo appearance as herself late in the film. In her autobiography, Lamour wrote that Crosby thought her too old to be a leading lady (she was 48), while Hope refused to do the film without her. Her extended cameo that featured her singing with Hope and Crosby was a compromise. Other cameos are provided by David Niven, Peter Sellers, Roger Delgado, Jerry Colonna, Frank Sinatra and Dean Martin. In order to preserve the feel of the 1940s and '50s Road films, the movie was shot in black and white (even though the previous entry Road to Bali had been shot in colour).

The name of Hope's character, "Chester Babcock", is an in-joke. Edward Chester Babcock was the real name of Hollywood composer Jimmy Van Heusen, whose work is featured in this and other "Road" pictures. The lamasery where Hope goes to restore his memory is reused from Black Narcissus. Peter Sellers' appearance as an Indian physician involves extended interplay with Crosby and Hope.

The plot of the film (released 22 May 1962) involves espionage and space rockets predating Dr. No (released 5 October 1962) and the spy craze of the 1960s. Hope and Crosby are up against a SPECTRE type organization called "The Third Echelon" who have their own underwater secret headquarters and are led by Robert Morley with James Bond film regular Walter Gotell as "Dr. Zorbb" and Bob Simmons as an astronaut. The film's art director is another Bond film regular, Syd Cain.

Although the movie features the same kind of antics and gags as previous episodes, with all characters trying their utmost to help each other, the film was not as well-received as its predecessors. Some critics felt that the 59-year-old Hope and Crosby couldn't pull off the part credibly at their age and that it was unfair for them to dump their old partner Lamour (with whom they had excellent screen chemistry) for the more youthful Collins. Others thought the decade-long gap since the last Road movie wrecked the momentum of the series and that Peter Sellers came off as more fresh and funny than the aging stars of the film.

In 1977, Sir Lew Grade had planned to reunite Hope, Crosby and Lamour in The Road to the Fountain of Youth for which Melville Shavelson had completed the script, but Crosby died before production. Crosby was rumored to have asked the writers for a Monty Python-esque script in order to keep the series fresh for 1970s audiences.

This is the only Road film to have its rights retained by the original producer/distributor (where all the previous films are now at the hands of other companies), although today Metro-Goldwyn-Mayer (UA's sister studio) handles distribution and marketing on behalf of UA.

== Reception ==
=== Critical ===
Bosley Crowther of The New York Times welcomed it saying, among other things: "Age may have withered somewhat the glossy hides of Bing Crosby and Bob Hope, and custom may have done a little something to stale their brand of vaudeville. But the old boys still come through nicely in another turn in the old “Road” act by which they were jointly elevated to international eminence about twenty years ago...But practically every moment spent with Bing and Bob is good for consecutive chuckles and frequent belly-deep guffaws. For their former travel agents, Norman Panama and Melvin Frank, who have not only written this picture but produced and directed it, have provided them with the gags and business to make for much humorous verbal give-and-take and an almost unending succession of crazy and corny contretemps."

Variety provided a positive review as well, stating: "The seventh “Road” comedy, after a lapse of seven years, should cause a seven-year itch among tab buyers to get in at the laughs. For they come thick and fast in this genial piece of nonsense. Perhaps the old formula creaks occasionally, but not enough to cause any disappointment while the zany situations and razor-edge wisecracks keep the whole affair bubbling happily. . . . The result is an amiable comedy which should please nostalgic customers and entice those who haven’t seen any of the previous “Road” pix..."

=== Box office ===
The film earned $2.3 million in theatrical rentals in the United States and Canada in 1962 and was estimated to earn $2.6 million in total.

Films and Filming said it was the fifth most popular movie in Britain for the year ended 31 October 1962 after Navarone, Dr No, The Young Ones and Only Two Can Play. According to Kinematograph Weekly the film was considered a "money maker" at the British box office in 1962.

== Songs ==
All songs were written by Jimmy Van Heusen (music) and Sammy Cahn (lyrics) with the exception of "Personality".

- "Team Work" sung by Bing Crosby and Bob Hope, and again by Crosby, Hope and Joan Collins.
- "The Road to Hong Kong" sung by Bing Crosby and Bob Hope.
- "Let's Not Be Sensible" sung by Bing Crosby and Joan Collins.
- "Personality" extract sung by Dorothy Lamour.
- "Warmer Than a Whisper" sung by Dorothy Lamour.

A soundtrack album was released by Liberty Records.

== Home media ==
The Road to Hong Kong was released on Region 1 DVD by MGM Home Video on 1 April 2003 and on Region A Blu-ray by Olive Films on 17 February 2015.

== Cancelled sequel ==
In 1977, an eighth Road to... movie was planned, titled Road to the Fountain of Youth, but the film ultimately was cancelled due to Crosby's death that year.
