= Secrets of a Hollywood Super Madam =

Book by Jody Gibson

- Author: Jody Gibson
- Language: English
- Publisher: Corona Books
- Publication date: February 14, 2007
- Publication place: United States
- ISBN: 978-0-9792202-0-3
- OCLC: 122898852

Secrets of a Hollywood Super Madam is an autobiography written by Jody Gibson.

== Plot summary ==
In the late 1980s–1990s Gibson ran an exclusive "escort service" based in Hollywood, California, U.S.A., under the name "Sasha from the Valley", while also leading a double life on radio and television as a minor actress and recording artist. The book describes Gibson's life during this period. She was subsequently tried and convicted of pimping and conspiracy in a high media profile trial and sent to prison. Gibson claimed in the book that public figures used her business. Included in the text is court data from her "Black Book", which was introduced as evidence at the trial.
