= Anything Goes (1936 film) =

1936 American musical film

- Theatrical release poster
- Directed by: Lewis Milestone
- Screenplay by: Russel Crouse; Howard Lindsay
- Based on: Anything Goes by Guy Bolton and P. G. Wodehouse
- Produced by: Benjamin Glazer
- Starring: Bing Crosby; Ethel Merman; Charles Ruggles; Ida Lupino
- Cinematography: Karl Struss
- Edited by: Eda Warren
- Music by: Cole Porter
- Production company: Paramount Pictures
- Distributed by: Paramount Pictures
- Release date: January 24, 1936 (USA)
- Running time: 92 minutes
- Country: United States
- Language: English

Anything Goes is a 1936 American musical film directed by Lewis Milestone and starring Bing Crosby, Ethel Merman, Charles Ruggles and Ida Lupino. It is based on the 1934 stage musical Anything Goes by Guy Bolton and P. G. Wodehouse, which included songs by Cole Porter.

When Paramount sold the film's television rights, it retitled the film Tops Is the Limit because the 1956 film version, also produced by Paramount, was currently running in theaters.

== Plot ==
A young man falls in love with a beautiful woman whom he follows onto a luxury liner, where he discovers that she is an English heiress who fled her home and is being returned to England. He also discovers that his boss is on the ship. To avoid identification, he disguises himself as the gangster accomplice of a minister, who is actually a gangster running from the law.

== Cast ==
- Bing Crosby as Billy Crocker
- Ethel Merman as Reno Sweeney
- Charles Ruggles as Rev. Dr. Moon
- Ida Lupino as Hope Harcourt
- Grace Bradley as Bonnie LeTour
- Arthur Treacher as Sir Evelyn Oakleigh
- Robert McWade as Elisha J. Whitney
- Richard Carle as Bishop Dobson
- Margaret Dumont as Mrs. Wentworth
- Jerry Tucker as Junior
- Matt Moore as Capt. McPhail
- Pat Collins as Executive Officer
- Edward Gargan as First Detective
- Matt McHugh as Second Detective
- Budd Fine as Pug-Ugly
- Jack Mulhall as Ship's Purser
- The Avalon Boys as Quartette
- Jack Norton as drunken passenger (uncredited)
- Philip Ahn as Ling (uncredited)
- Keye Luke as Ching (uncredited)
- John Carradine as Bearded Ballet Master (uncredited)

== Production credits ==
Significant contributions to the production include the following:

- Production company - Paramount Productions
- Distribution - Paramount Productions
- Director - Lewis Milestone
- Assistant director - Nate Watt
- Producers - Adolph Zukor (name above credits, "Adolph Zukor Presents...") and Benjamin Glazer (opening credit as "produced by")
- Photography - Karl Struss
- Art directors - Hans Dreier and Ernst Fegté
- Film editor - Eda Warren
- Costumes - Travis Banton
- Choreography - LeRoy Prinz
- Sound recording - Jack Goodrich and Don Johnson
- Special photographic effcts - Farciot Edouart

== Soundtrack ==
- "Anything Goes", sung by Ethel Merman
- "You're the Top", sung by Bing Crosby and Ethel Merman
- "I Get a Kick Out of You", sung by Ethel Merman
- "There'll Always Be a Lady Fair", written by Cole Porter, sung by the Avalon Boys and Bing Crosby
- "My Heart and I", written by Frederick Hollander and Leo Robin, sung by Bing Crosby
- "Sailor Beware" written by Richard Whiting and Leo Robin, sung by Bing Crosby
- "Moonburn", sung by Bing Crosby
- "Shanghai-De-Ho", written by Frederick Hollander and Leo Robin, sung by Bing Crosby and Ethel Merman

The film required revisions of Cole Porter's lyrics to pass Production Code censors. Only four of his songs remained: "Anything Goes", "I Get a Kick Out of You", "There'll Always Be a Lady Fair" and "You're the Top". "You're the Top" contained substantially revised lyrics, and only the first line (sung by Ethel Merman during the opening credits) was retained from the song "Anything Goes".

Crosby helped to obtain four new songs from several new songwriters, Richard A. Whiting, Hoagy Carmichael, Leo Robin, Edward Heyman and Friedrich Hollander. "Moonburn", written by Carmichael and Heyman, became a minor hit for Crosby.

Crosby recorded three of the new songs for Decca Records, and they were also included in the Bing's Hollywood series.

== Reception ==
In a contemporary review for The New York Times, critic Frank Nugent lamented the absence of Victor Moore, the star of the stage production of Anything Goes: "'Anything Goes' without Victor Moore is comparable to 'You're the Top' without Cole Porter's lyrics. It gets by, but without distinction. ... Otherwise (but what a huge deficit to overcome!) Paramount has done rather well by 'Anything Goes.' ... Bing Crosby is an acceptable substitute for the show’s William Gaxton in almost every subdivision except that in which he joins Miss Merman in 'You’re the Top'. It doesn’t seem possible, but Mr. Crosby croons it."

Variety wrote: "Cole Porter’s lyrics, which were the original essence and chief asset of the original stage Anything Goes have been sacrificed for and replaced by plot motion in this Paramount film adaptation. ... Ethel Merman comes from the original cast and her job in the picture equals her job in the stage version, which means aces. Crosby in the Billy Gaxton juve lead makes it more important than the latter did, because of the extra territory taken in by his singing ... As directed by Lewis Milestone everything moves along swiftly. On the whole, as screen entertainment and as musical adaptation, Par’s ‘Goes’ will do."

Writing for The Spectator in 1936, Graham Greene panned the film and criticized Crosby's slow and "moony methods" of singing in "a picture which should rattle quite as fast as a sub-machine gun." Greene also wrote that the song "You're the Top" had been "murdered."
