= I've Got My Captain Working for Me Now =

1919 song by Irving Berlin

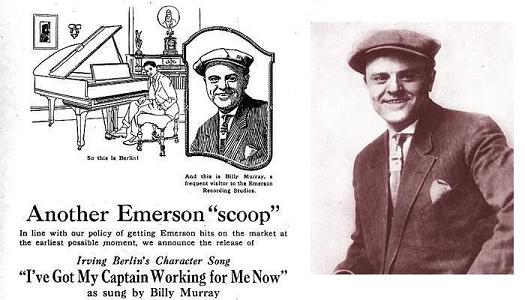
Billy Murray in newspaper ad for the song

The song sung by Al Jolson

"I've Got My Captain Working for Me Now" is a popular song written in 1919 by Irving Berlin. It was published by Music Publishers Inc. in New York, New York.

The song tells of a young man who returns to work as a manager in his father's factory following his tour of duty as a Private First Class in World War I. His now-unemployed former Captain is hired as a clerk by the delighted former PFC. Sample lyric:

When I come into the office he gets up on his feet
Stands at attention and gives me his seat
Who was it said "revenge is sweet"?
I've got my Captain working for me now

This song was in the top 20 from October 1919 to January 1920 and reached number 6 in November and December 1919.

Al Jolson and Billy Murray had successful recordings of the song in 1919-20. It was also recorded in 1919, by Eddie Cantor, for Pathe (#22201). The song was revived by Bing Crosby in the 1946 film, Blue Skies and he made a commercial recording for Decca Records on July 24, 1946 which was included in his album Blue Skies.
