= You Keep Coming Back Like a Song =

Song by Bing Crosby

from the album Blue Skies
- B-side: "Getting Nowhere"
- Released: 1946
- Recorded: July 18, 1946
- Genre: Easy listening, pop
- Label: Decca
- Songwriter: Irving Berlin

"You Keep Coming Back Like a Song" is a popular song written by Irving Berlin for the 1946 film Blue Skies, where it was introduced by Bing Crosby. The song was nominated for "Best Song" in 1946 but lost out to "On the Atchison, Topeka and the Santa Fe". Dinah Shore's version was biggest in the US reaching the No. 5 spot, while Crosby's version (recorded July 18, 1946) peaked at No. 12. Jo Stafford also had chart success with it and her version achieved the No.11 position.

== Other notable recordings ==
- Georgia Gibbs - originally recorded in 1946 and later included in her album "Her Nibs!! Miss Georgia Gibbs"
- Ella Fitzgerald - Ella Fitzgerald Sings the Irving Berlin Songbook (1958)
- Red Garland recorded it for his 1969 album Red Garland Revisited! (Prestige).
- Maude Maggart included the song in her 2005 album "Maude Maggart Sings Irving Berlin".
