= Sinner or Saint (song) =

Single by Sarah Vaughan
- B-side: "Mighty Lonesome Feelin'"
- Released: 1952
- Label: Mercury
- Songwriter: Irving Gordon

"Sinner or Saint" is a song that was a hit in 1952 as recorded for Mercury Records by Sarah Vaughan (with Percy Faith and his orchestra and chorus) and by Georgia Gibbs (with an orchestra conducted by Glenn Osser).

== Composition ==
The song was written by Irving Gordon.

== Critical reception ==
On 18 October 1952, Billboard cited a record dealer praising the Sarah Vaughan version. According to him, Vaughan's latest offerings, "Say You'll Wait for Me" and this one, had "much improved in what seems commercial style" and were "perfection from her first to last note of Percy Faith's wonderful orchestration". Nevertheless, while praising the songs, the said dealer complained about their lack of sales.

Georgia Gibbs version
Review scores
Source	Rating
Billboard	79/100 (excellent)

Earlier, in its issue from 4 October, the magazine reviewed Georgia Gibbs's version (Mercury 5219, coupled with "My Favorite Song"), calling it a "pretty item" that received a "fine reading" and rating it 79 on the scale of 1 to 100.

== Commercial performance ==
Vaughan's single charted at No. 22 on Billboard's Records Most Played by Disk Jockeys chart in the issue dated 8 November 1952.

== Charts ==
Chart (1952)	Peak position
US Billboard Records Most Played by Disk Jockeys	22
