= Marion Mann (singer) =

American singer (1914–2004)

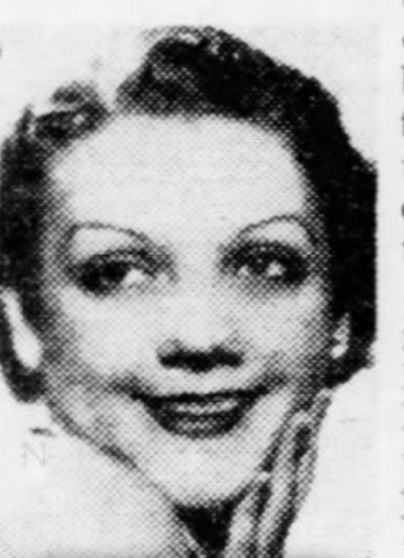
- Promotional headshot from 1941
- Born: September 9, 1914; Columbus, Ohio, U.S.
- Died: October 11, 2004 (aged 90); South Bloomingville, Ohio, U.S.
- Occupations: Big band singer and radio personality

Marion Mann (born Marion Mann Bateson, September 9, 1914 – October 11, 2004) was an American singer with Bob Crosby's Orchestra and Bob Cats from 1938 to 1941.

Mann was born in Columbus, Ohio on September 9, 1914. Before singing professionally, she gained a reputation in Columbus as a star swimmer.

Mann was discovered by Emerson Gill in early 1933 and began using the stage name Marion Mann. In December of that year, while traveling with Gill's orchestra to perform at the Zembo Shrine Building, and Mann billed as the main attraction, the car Mann was in skidded into a pole. She was hospitalized with a punctured scalp, a fractured collarbone and pelvis, a dislocated hip, and shock.

Mann's work with Gill brought her enough notability to be hired by Bob Crosby and by Jan Garber.

After her tenure with Bob Crosby ended, she worked on Don McNeill's Breakfast Club from 1942 to 1947. She was also on the radio shows Club Matinee and Weekend Cruise.

In 1941 she sang with Crosby and the Bob Cats on "Shakespeare in Swing", a two-disc album of four songs released by Decca. She recorded some Musicraft sides in 1945 with Jose Bethancourt (ne José P. Bethancourt; 1906–1978) and his Orchestra.

On March 18, 1945, Sweetheart Time debuted on radio station WOR with Mann as the featured female singer.

Mann died in South Bloomingville, Ohio on October 11, 2004, at the age of 90.
