= Moonburn =

Single by Bing Crosby
- B-side: "On Treasure Island"; (Joe Burke/Edgar Leslie)
- Released: 1936
- Recorded: November 13, 1935
- Genre: Pop
- Length: 3:13
- Label: Decca DLA262
- Songwriters: Hoagy Carmichael, Edward Heyman

"Moonburn" is a 1935 American popular song written by Hoagy Carmichael and Edward Heyman. It was the first song written by Hoagy Carmichael for films and it was introduced by Bing Crosby in the 1936 film Anything Goes. A definitive jazz recording of the song was made by Crosby for Decca Records on November 13, 1935, with Georgie Stoll's Instrumental Trio featuring Bobby Sherwood on guitar and Joe Sullivan on piano.

Other recordings were made by Chick Bullock, Joe Morrison and his Orchestra, for Brunswick Records (catalog 7588), Hal Kemp and his Orchestra for Brunswick Records (catalog 7589), Little Jack Little for Columbia Records (catalog No. 3107D). the Casa Loma Orchestra, and Eddy Duchin and his Orchestra.
