= Jody Gibson =

American madam (1957–2022)

Jody Gibson

Jody Gibson (known as Babydol; (April 27, 1957 – January 2, 2022) was an American madam, writer and actress who was active in Hollywood in the late 1980s through the 1990s.

Using the pseudonym "Sasha of the Valley", Gibson operated an "escort agency" in Hollywood, employing several hundred women across 16 states of the United States and in Europe. In June 1999, she was arrested on charges of pimping and conspiracy; subsequently being convicted, she served 22 months of imprisonment in the Central California Women's Facility.

== Biography ==
Gibson was raised in Westchester County, New York, in a show business family. Her father was a 1940s CBS radio announcer who later owned a chain of clothing boutiques. Her mother, Tobe Gibson, was a personal talent manager who discovered Tom Cruise as an unknown actor; her sister Amy Gibson was an Emmy-nominated actress, and her aunt was the singer Georgia Gibbs. It was her aunt's career that gave Gibson the ambition to be a pop music singer. Upon high school graduation, she left Westchester and relocated to Manhattan, where she lived on the Upper East Side for several years. She relocated to Los Angeles, California in 1984, seeking a music and modeling career. For two years, she was an occasional actress on the USA Network's Up All Night with Rhonda Shear. Whilst trying to get her recording career off the ground, to make a living she began a small modelling agency in 1988, which quickly evolved into an illicit escort business servicing a financially exclusive clientele. She died on January 2, 2022, at the age of 64.

== Imprisonment ==
On June 8, 1999, Gibson was arrested in a sting operation in West Los Angeles and charged with pimping and pandering. At the time of her arrest, the prosecution stated Gibson ran one of the largest prostitution procurement operations since Heidi Fleiss, employing around 300 women. According to Gibson, Fleiss began to work for her around 1990 before setting out on her own. Gibson's subsequent trial led to a conviction and imprisonment. Her customer database, or Black Book, was entered as evidence at her 2000 trial, listing Bruce Willis, Tommy Lasorda, British rock guitarist Steve Jones, film producer Don Simpson, and former Texas lieutenant governor Ben Barnes among her clients. Willis, Barnes, and Lasorda were among those who denied any association with Gibson's business. She was released from prison in 2002.

== Writings ==
An autobiographical account of Gibson's life in Hollywood, entitled Secrets of a Hollywood Super Madam, was published in 2007. In the book, she claimed public figures used her business and the text features court data from her "Black Book", which was introduced as evidence at her trial. Gibson also published two other books about life: Sex on the Internet: Super Madam (2008) and Convicted: A True Story, which was published in 2015.

Gibson also published Seduced: Diary of a Double Dealing Spy, a true story about a Chinese-born CIA agent.
