= 2002–03 Alabama–Huntsville Chargers men's ice hockey season =

American college ice hockey team season

2002–03 Alabama–Huntsville Chargers men's ice hockey

CHA Regular Season Champions

UConn Classic Champions
- Conference: College Hockey America
- Record: 18–14–3 (13–5–2 CHA)
- Head coach: Doug Ross (21st season)
- Captain: Mike Funk
- Alternate captain: Joel Bresciani, Steve Charlebois
- Home stadium: Von Braun Center

The 2002–03 Alabama–Huntsville Chargers ice hockey team represented the University of Alabama in Huntsville in the 2002–03 NCAA Division I men's ice hockey season. The Chargers were coached by Doug Ross who was in his twenty-first season as head coach. The Chargers played their home games in the Von Braun Center and were members of the College Hockey America conference.

== Roster ==
No.	Nat.	Player	Class	Pos	Height	Weight	DoB	Hometown	Previous team
1		Mark Byrne	Senior	G	5' 10" (1.78 m)	170 lb (77 kg)	1978-03-22	Nepean, Ontario	Penticton (BCHL)
2		John Bradley	Junior	D	6' 2" (1.88 m)	210 lb (95 kg)	1980-09-16	Hermantown, Minnesota	Billings (AWHL)
3		David Halliwill	Senior	D	6' 1" (1.85 m)	185 lb (84 kg)	1979-04-28	Windsor, Ontario	Chatham (GOJHL)
4		Jeremy Schreiber	Freshman	D	6' 1" (1.85 m)	200 lb (91 kg)	1981-07-04	Medicine Hat, Alberta	Canmore (AJHL)
5		Ryan Brown	Sophomore	D	6' 1" (1.85 m)	215 lb (98 kg)	1980-03-26	Chatham, Ontario	Chatham (GOJHL)
6		Ian Fletcher	Junior	D	6' 1" (1.85 m)	195 lb (88 kg)	1978-07-07	Delta, British Columbia	Victoria (BCHL)
7		Jared Ross	Sophomore	C	5' 9" (1.75 m)	165 lb (75 kg)	1982-09-18	Huntsville, Alabama	Catholic Central HS (USHS–MI)
8		Ryan Leasa	Senior	D	6' 1" (1.85 m)	175 lb (79 kg)	1980-05-18	Sarnia, Ontario	Sarnia (GOJHL)
9		Steve Charlebois (A)	Senior	LW	5' 9" (1.75 m)	170 lb (77 kg)	1978-09-01	Carbon, Alberta	Penticton (BCHL)
10		Doug Watkins	Sophomore	D	5' 10" (1.78 m)	185 lb (84 kg)	1980-08-20	Kelowna, British Columbia	Weyburn (SJHL)
11		Jason Tinwick	Junior	C	5' 9" (1.75 m)	180 lb (82 kg)	1979-01-23	Tecumseh, Ontario	Tecumseh (WOHL)
12		Jackson Harren	Junior	LW	6' 2" (1.88 m)	210 lb (95 kg)	1980-03-10	Warroad, Minnesota	Dubuque (USHL)
14		Todd Bentley	Freshman	LW	5' 10" (1.78 m)	190 lb (86 kg)	1982-01-07	Livonia, Michigan	Cedar Rapids (USHL)
15		Bruce Mulherin	Freshman	C	6' 1" (1.85 m)	195 lb (88 kg)	1982-02-03	Red Deer, Alberta	Olds (AJHL)
16		Craig Bushey	Sophomore	RW	5' 11" (1.8 m)	185 lb (84 kg)	1980-02-27	Ignace, Ontario	Cleveland (NAHL)
18		Gerald Overton	Senior	C	5' 10" (1.78 m)	175 lb (79 kg)	1978-08-24	150 Mile House, British Columbia	Quesnel (BCHL)
19		Jason Hawes	Senior	C	5' 11" (1.8 m)	190 lb (86 kg)	1978-06-16	Perth, Ontario	Brockville (CCHL)
20		Joel Bresciani (A)	Senior	RW	6' 1" (1.85 m)	200 lb (91 kg)	1978-08-17	Sherwood Park, Alberta	Vernon (BCHL)
21		Steve Milosevski	Junior	RW	6' 1" (1.85 m)	170 lb (77 kg)	1978-12-18	Windsor, Ontario	Tecumseh (WOHL)
22		Mike Funk (C)	Junior	LW	6' 4" (1.93 m)	220 lb (100 kg)	1978-11-19	Newton, Manitoba	Portage (MJHL)
23		Keith Rowe	Sophomore	RW	5' 11" (1.8 m)	190 lb (86 kg)	1981-04-13	Livonia, Michigan	Danville (NAHL)
24		Jeff Winchester	Freshman	D	6' 3" (1.91 m)	220 lb (100 kg)	1981-11-06	Dalhousie, New Brunswick	Cornwall (CCHL)
25		Kārlis Zirnis	Senior	LW	5' 11" (1.8 m)	185 lb (84 kg)	1977-11-02	Riga, Latvia	Gaylord (NAHL)
26		Luke Flaig	Freshman	C	5' 11" (1.8 m)	175 lb (79 kg)	1981-09-18	Eden Prairie, Minnesota	Chicago (USHL)
27		Tyler Butler	Senior	D	6' 2" (1.88 m)	205 lb (93 kg)	1979-07-08	Kanata, Ontario	Kanata Valley (CJHL)
29		Scott Munroe	Freshman	G	6' 2" (1.88 m)	195 lb (88 kg)	1982-01-20	Moose Jaw, Saskatchewan	Notre Dame (SJHL)
30		Adam MacLean	Junior	G	5' 11" (1.8 m)	160 lb (73 kg)	1980-07-04	Woodstock, Ontario	St. Marys (WOHL)

== Season ==
=== Schedule ===
Date	Time	Opponent	Site	Decision	Result	Attendance	Record
Regular Season
October 18	7:35 pm	at Wisconsin*	Kohl Center • Madison, Wisconsin	Byrne	L 2–4	9,678	0–1–0
October 19	8:05 pm	at Wisconsin*	Kohl Center • Madison, Wisconsin	Munroe	L 2–3	10,300	0–2–0
October 25	8:35 pm	at #2 Denver*	Magness Arena • Denver, Colorado	Byrne	L 2–7	4,475	0–3–0
October 26	8:05 pm	at #2 Denver*	Magness Arena • Denver, Colorado	MacLean	L 0–7	5,457	0–4–0
November 1	7:05 pm	at #4 Minnesota*	Mariucci Arena • Minneapolis, Minnesota	Byrne	L 1–12	10,058	0–5–0
November 2	7:05 pm	at #4 Minnesota*	Mariucci Arena • Minneapolis, Minnesota	Munroe	L 2–4	10,031	0–6–0
November 15	7:05 pm	Air Force	Von Braun Center • Huntsville, Alabama	Byrne	W 4–2	3,074	1–6–0 (1–0–0)
November 16	7:05 pm	Air Force	Von Braun Center • Huntsville, Alabama	Munroe	W 5–2	1,898	2–6–0 (2–0–0)
November 22	6:05 pm	at Wayne State	Great Lakes Sports City Superior Arena • Detroit, Michigan	Byrne	L 4–5 ^{OT}	762	2–7–0 (2–1–0)
November 23	6:05 pm	at Wayne State	Great Lakes Sports City Superior Arena • Detroit, Michigan	Munroe	W 5–2	785	3–7–0 (3–1–0)
November 30	1:35 pm	Niagara	Von Braun Center • Huntsville, Alabama	Byrne	T 3–3 ^{OT}	1,183	3–7–1 (3–1–1)
December 1	1:05 pm	Niagara	Von Braun Center • Huntsville, Alabama	Munroe	W 7–4	977	4–7–1 (4–1–1)
December 6	6:00 pm	at Sacred Heart*	Milford Ice Pavilion • Fairfield, Connecticut	Byrne	T 3–3 ^{OT}	401	4–7–2 (4–1–1)
December 7	6:00 pm	at Sacred Heart*	Milford Ice Pavilion • Fairfield, Connecticut	Munroe	W 6–2	322	5–7–2 (4–1–1)
December 29	1:00 pm	vs. #8 Ferris State*	UConn Ice Arena • Storrs, Connecticut (UConn Classic)	Munroe	W 5–4 ^{OT}	200	6–7–2 (4–1–1)
December 30	4:15 pm	vs. Findlay*	UConn Ice Arena • Storrs, Connecticut (UConn Classic)	Byrne	W 4–2	N/A	7–7–2 (4–1–1)
January 3	7:05 pm	Fairfield*	Von Braun Center • Huntsville, Alabama	Munroe	W 8–1	2,471	8–7–2 (4–1–1)
January 4	7:05 pm	Fairfield*	Von Braun Center • Huntsville, Alabama	Byrne	W 8–2	2,564	9–7–2 (4–1–1)
January 10	6:05 pm	at Findlay	Clauss Ice Arena • Findlay, Ohio	Munroe	W 5–2	375	10–7–2 (5–1–1)
January 11	6:05 pm	at Findlay	Clauss Ice Arena • Findlay, Ohio	Byrne	W 5–2	1,158	11–7–2 (6–1–1)
January 16	7:05 pm	Bemidji State	Von Braun Center • Huntsville, Alabama	Munroe	W 3–2 ^{OT}	947	12–7–2 (7–1–1)
January 17	7:05 pm	Bemidji State	Von Braun Center • Huntsville, Alabama	Munroe	W 4–3 ^{OT}	2,835	13–7–2 (8–1–1)
January 24	6:05 pm	at Northern Michigan*	Berry Events Center • Marquette, Michigan	Munroe	L 3–7	2,522	13–8–2 (8–1–1)
January 25	6:05 pm	at Northern Michigan*	Berry Events Center • Marquette, Michigan	Munroe	L 0–2	3,384	13–9–2 (8–1–1)
January 31	8:05 pm	at Air Force	Cadet Ice Arena • Colorado Springs, Colorado	Munroe	T 2–2 ^{OT}	1,007	13–9–3 (8–1–2)
February 1	8:05 pm	at Air Force	Cadet Ice Arena • Colorado Springs, Colorado	Byrne	W 3–1	1,052	14–9–3 (9–1–2)
February 15	8:30 pm	Wayne State	Von Braun Center • Huntsville, Alabama	Munroe	W 4–0	N/A	15–9–3 (10–1–2)
February 16	4:00 pm	Wayne State	Von Braun Center • Huntsville, Alabama	Byrne	W 8–2	1,813	16–9–3 (11–1–2)
February 21	7:35 pm	at Bemidji State	John S. Glas Field House • Bemidji, Minnesota	Munroe	W 6–3	1,458	17–9–3 (12–1–2)
February 22	7:05 pm	at Bemidji State	John S. Glas Field House • Bemidji, Minnesota	Byrne	L 2–3 ^{OT}	1,548	17–10–3 (12–2–2)
February 28	7:05 pm	Findlay	Von Braun Center • Huntsville, Alabama	Munroe	L 3–4	2,429	17–11–3 (12–3–2)
March 1	1:35 pm	Findlay	Von Braun Center • Huntsville, Alabama	Byrne	W 6–3	1,636	18–11–3 (13–3–2)
March 7	6:05 pm	at Niagara	Dwyer Arena • Lewiston, New York	MacLean	L 4–7	885	18–12–3 (13–4–2)
March 8	6:05 pm	at Niagara	Dwyer Arena • Lewiston, New York	Byrne	L 5–7	945	18–13–3 (13–5–2)
CHA Tournament
March 15	7:05 pm	Bemidji State*	Tri-City Arena • Kearney, Nebraska (CHA Tournament Semifinal)	Munroe	L 1–2 ^{OT}	1,468	18–14–3 (13–5–2)
*Non-conference game. All times are in Central Time.

=== Standings ===
2002–03 College Hockey America standings
	Conference							Overall					
	GP	W	L	T	PTS	GF	GA	GP	W	L	T	GF	GA
Alabama–Huntsville†	20	13	5	2	28	88	59	35	18	14	3	135	121
Niagara	20	11	4	5	27	77	60	37	15	17	5	126	133
Wayne State*	20	11	7	2	24	62	56	40	21	17	2	131	131
Bemidji State	20	10	6	4	24	58	46	36	14	14	8	95	98
Findlay	20	3	13	4	10	41	77	35	10	21	4	93	120
Air Force	20	2	15	3	7	45	73	37	10	24	3	98	146
Championship: Wayne State † indicates conference regular season champion * indicates conference tournament champion Final rankings: USA Today/USA Hockey Magazine Top 15 Poll

=== Statistics ===
==== Skaters ====
Player	Pos	Yr	GP	G	A	Pts	PIM	PPG	SHG	GWG
Jared Ross	C	So	35	20	20	40	30	10	0	2
Mike Funk	LW	Jr	35	13	22	35	40	4	1	2
Jason Hawes	C	Sr	35	5	30	35	10	0	1	0
Kārlis Zirnis	LW	Sr	33	13	19	32	59	3	1	0
Steve Charlebois	LW	Sr	34	18	10	28	36	4	3	3
Craig Bushey	RW	So	35	7	17	24	32	2	0	1
Joel Bresciani	RW	Sr	35	15	7	22	101	2	1	3
Jeremy Schreiber	D	Fr	31	5	16	21	27	4	1	1
Ryan Leasa	D	Sr	35	5	15	20	70	3	1	0
Tyler Butler	D	Sr	35	4	16	20	42	2	0	1
Keith Rowe	RW	So	35	9	9	18	38	0	0	1
Doug Watkins	D	So	31	2	9	11	83	0	0	1
Gerald Overton	C	Sr	21	2	8	10	32	0	1	1
Todd Bentley	LW	Fr	23	4	5	9	28	0	0	0
Steve Milosevski	RW	Jr	31	4	4	8	10	0	0	0
Ian Fletcher	D	Jr	28	1	7	8	26	0	0	0
Jason Tinwick	C	Jr	22	3	3	6	21	0	0	1
Ryan Brown	D	So	25	2	4	6	20	0	0	0
Bruce Mulherin	C	Fr	22	1	2	3	8	0	1	1
Jeff Winchester	D	Fr	15	1	1	2	38	0	0	0
Jackson Harren	LW	Jr	21	1	1	2	2	0	0	0
John Bradley	D	Jr	2	0	2	2	2	0	0	0
Scott Munroe	G	Fr	20	0	2	2		0	0	0
Mark Byrne	G	Sr	17	0	1	1		0	0	0
Luke Flaig	C	Fr	3	0	0	0	0	0	0	0
Adam MacLean	G	Jr	3	0	0	0		0	0	0
David Halliwill	D	Sr	8	0	0	0	10	0	0	0
Team			35	135	230	365	765	34	11	18

==== Goalies ====
Player	Yr	GP	TOI	W	L	T	GA	GAA	SV	SV%	SO
Scott Munroe	Fr	20	1049	11	6	1	49	2.80	542	0.917	1
Mark Byrne	Sr	17	964	7	6	2	58	3.61	456	0.887	0
Adam MacLean	Jr	3	127	0	2	0	12	5.68	69	0.852	0
