= 2001–02 Alabama–Huntsville Chargers men's ice hockey season =

American college ice hockey team season

2001–02 Alabama–Huntsville Chargers men's ice hockey
- Conference: College Hockey America
- Record: 18–18–1 (10–9–1 CHA)
- Head coach: Doug Ross (20th season)
- Assistant coach: Lance West
- Captain: Kevin Ridgeway
- Alternate captain: Joel Bresciani, Mike Funk
- Home stadium: Von Braun Center

The 2001–02 Alabama–Huntsville Chargers ice hockey team represented the University of Alabama in Huntsville in the 2001–02 NCAA Division I men's ice hockey season. The Chargers were coached by Doug Ross who was in his twentieth season as head coach. The Chargers played their home games in the Von Braun Center and were members of the College Hockey America conference.

== Roster ==
| No. | Nat. | Player | Class | Pos | Height | Weight | DoB | Hometown | Previous team |
|---|---|---|---|---|---|---|---|---|---|
| 1 | | Mark Byrne | Junior | G | 5' 10" (1.78 m) | 170 lb (77 kg) | 1978-03-22 | Nepean, Ontario | Penticton (BCHL) |
| 2 | | John Bradley | Sophomore | D | 6' 3" (1.91 m) | 215 lb (98 kg) | 1980-09-16 | Hermantown, Minnesota | Billings (AWHL) |
| 3 | | David Halliwill | Junior | D | 6' 1" (1.85 m) | 190 lb (86 kg) | 1979-04-28 | Windsor, Ontario | Chatham (GOJHL) |
| 4 | | Kevin Ridgeway (C) | Senior | D | 6' 2" (1.88 m) | 200 lb (91 kg) | 1979-01-26 | Ottawa, Ontario | Nepean (CJHL) |
| 5 | | Ryan Brown | Freshman | D | 6' 1" (1.85 m) | 215 lb (98 kg) | 1980-03-26 | Chatham, Ontario | Chatham (GOJHL) |
| 6 | | Ian Fletcher | Junior | D | 6' 1" (1.85 m) | 195 lb (88 kg) | 1978-07-07 | Delta, British Columbia | Victoria (BCHL) |
| 7 | | Jared Ross | Freshman | C | 5' 9" (1.75 m) | 165 lb (75 kg) | 1982-09-18 | Huntsville, Alabama | Catholic Central HS (USHS–MI) |
| 8 | | Ryan Leasa | Junior | D | 6' 1" (1.85 m) | 175 lb (79 kg) | 1980-05-18 | Sarnia, Ontario | Sarnia (GOJHL) |
| 9 | | Steve Charlebois | Junior | RW | 5' 9" (1.75 m) | 170 lb (77 kg) | 1978-09-01 | Carbon, Alberta | Penticton (BCHL) |
| 10 | | Doug Watkins | Freshman | D | 5' 10" (1.78 m) | 185 lb (84 kg) | 1980-08-20 | Kelowna, British Columbia | Weyburn (SJHL) |
| 11 | | Jason Tinwick | Sophomore | LW | 5' 9" (1.75 m) | 180 lb (82 kg) | 1979-01-23 | Tecumseh, Ontario | Tecumseh (WOHL) |
| 12 | | Jackson Harren | Sophomore | LW | 6' 2" (1.88 m) | 205 lb (93 kg) | 1980-03-10 | Warroad, Minnesota | Dubuque (USHL) |
| 14 | | Blake Thompson | Freshman | LW | 5' 10" (1.78 m) | 180 lb (82 kg) | 1980-03-06 | Huntsville, Alabama | Culver Military Academy (USHS–IN) |
| 15 | | Jessi Otis | Senior | LW | 6' 1" (1.85 m) | 190 lb (86 kg) | 1978-03-04 | Calgary, Alberta | Portage (MJHL) |
| 16 | | Craig Bushey | Freshman | RW | 5' 11" (1.8 m) | 185 lb (84 kg) | 1980-02-27 | Ignace, Ontario | Cleveland (NAHL) |
| 17 | | Steve Milosevski | Sophomore | C | 6' 1" (1.85 m) | 170 lb (77 kg) | 1978-12-18 | Windsor, Ontario | Tecumseh (WOHL) |
| 18 | | Gerald Overton | Junior | LW | 5' 10" (1.78 m) | 175 lb (79 kg) | 1978-08-24 | 150 Mile House, British Columbia | Quesnel (BCHL) |
| 19 | | Jason Hawes | Junior | C | 5' 11" (1.8 m) | 190 lb (86 kg) | 1978-06-16 | Perth, Ontario | Brockville (CCHL) |
| 20 | | Joel Bresciani (A) | Junior | RW | 6' 1" (1.85 m) | 200 lb (91 kg) | 1978-08-17 | Sherwood Park, Alberta | Vernon (BCHL) |
| 22 | | Mike Funk (A) | Junior | LW | 6' 1" (1.85 m) | 195 lb (88 kg) | 1978-11-19 | Newton, Manitoba | Portage (MJHL) |
| 23 | | Keith Rowe | Freshman | C | 5' 11" (1.8 m) | 190 lb (86 kg) | 1981-04-13 | Livonia, Michigan | Danville (NAHL) |
| 25 | | Kārlis Zirnis | Junior | LW | 5' 11" (1.8 m) | 185 lb (84 kg) | 1977-11-02 | Riga, Latvia | Gaylord (NAHL) |
| 27 | | Tyler Butler | Junior | D | 6' 2" (1.88 m) | 190 lb (86 kg) | 1979-07-08 | Kanata, Ontario | Kanata Valley (CJHL) |
| 30 | | Adam MacLean | Sophomore | G | 5' 11" (1.8 m) | 160 lb (73 kg) | 1980-07-04 | Woodstock, Ontario | St. Marys (WOHL) |
| 35 | | Mike Slaton | Junior | G | 5' 9" (1.75 m) | 180 lb (82 kg) | 1978-06-24 | Plymouth, Minnesota | Bozeman (AWHL) |

== Season ==
=== Schedule ===
| Date | Time | Opponent | Site | Decision | Result | Attendance | Record |
Regular Season
| October 12 | 7:05 pm | Bentley* | Von Braun Center • Huntsville, Alabama | MacLean | W 6–1 | 2,180 | 1–0–0 |
| October 13 | 7:05 pm | Bentley* | Von Braun Center • Huntsville, Alabama | MacLean | W 3–2 | 1,406 | 2–0–0 |
| October 19 | 6:00 pm | at Canisius* | Buffalo State Sports Arena • Buffalo, New York | MacLean | W 5–4 | 275 | 3–0–0 |
| October 20 | 6:00 pm | at Canisius* | Buffalo State Sports Arena • Buffalo, New York | MacLean | L 3–9 | 220 | 3–1–0 |
| October 26 | 7:05 pm | Air Force | Von Braun Center • Huntsville, Alabama | MacLean | W 2–0 | 2,170 | 4–1–0 (1–0–0) |
| October 27 | 7:05 pm | Air Force | Von Braun Center • Huntsville, Alabama | Byrne | W 3–1 | 1,945 | 5–1–0 (2–0–0) |
| November 2 | 6:00 pm | at Cornell* | Lynah Rink • Ithaca, New York | MacLean | L 1–6 | 3,800 | 5–2–0 (2–0–0) |
| November 3 | 6:00 pm | at Cornell* | Lynah Rink • Ithaca, New York | Byrne | L 2–5 | 3,832 | 5–3–0 (2–0–0) |
| November 9 | 7:05 pm | Niagara | Von Braun Center • Huntsville, Alabama | MacLean | L 2–5 | 1,945 | 5–4–0 (2–1–0) |
| November 10 | 7:05 pm | Niagara | Von Braun Center • Huntsville, Alabama | Byrne | W 5–3 | 1,408 | 6–4–0 (3–1–0) |
| November 16 | 7:35 pm | at Bemidji State | John S. Glas Field House • Bemidji, Minnesota | MacLean | L 3–7 | 1,697 | 6–5–0 (3–2–0) |
| November 17 | 7:05 pm | at Bemidji State | John S. Glas Field House • Bemidji, Minnesota | Byrne | W 6–3 | 1,632 | 7–5–0 (4–2–0) |
| November 23 | 7:05 pm | Sacred Heart* | Von Braun Center • Huntsville, Alabama | Byrne | W 5–3 | 1,612 | 8–5–0 (4–2–0) |
| November 24 | 7:05 pm | Sacred Heart* | Von Braun Center • Huntsville, Alabama | Byrne | W 6–3 | 1,341 | 9–5–0 (4–2–0) |
| November 30 | 6:05 pm | at Niagara | Dwyer Arena • Lewiston, New York | Byrne | W 4–1 | 1,101 | 10–5–0 (5–2–0) |
| December 1 | 6:05 pm | at Niagara | Dwyer Arena • Lewiston, New York | MacLean | L 5–8 | 977 | 10–6–0 (5–3–0) |
| December 7 | 6:05 pm | at Wayne State | Great Lakes Sports City Superior Arena • Fraser, Michigan | Byrne | L 3–4 | 399 | 10–7–0 (5–4–0) |
| December 8 | 6:05 pm | at Wayne State | Great Lakes Sports City Superior Arena • Fraser, Michigan | MacLean | T 3–3 ^{OT} | 479 | 10–7–1 (5–4–1) |
| December 28 | 7:05 pm | Wayne State | Von Braun Center • Huntsville, Alabama | Byrne | L 1–4 | 2,113 | 10–8–1 (5–5–1) |
| December 29 | 7:05 pm | Wayne State | Von Braun Center • Huntsville, Alabama | MacLean | L 4–6 | 1,555 | 10–9–1 (5–6–1) |
| January 4 | 7:05 pm | MSU–Mankato* | Von Braun Center • Huntsville, Alabama | Byrne | W 2–0 | 1,824 | 11–9–1 (5–6–1) |
| January 5 | 7:05 pm | MSU–Mankato* | Von Braun Center • Huntsville, Alabama | Byrne | L 1–5 | 1,862 | 11–10–1 (5–6–1) |
| January 11 | 7:05 pm | at Nebraska–Omaha* | Omaha Civic Auditorium • Omaha, Nebraska | Byrne | L 2–4 | 8,314 | 11–11–1 (5–6–1) |
| January 12 | 7:05 pm | at Nebraska–Omaha* | Omaha Civic Auditorium • Omaha, Nebraska | Byrne | L 2–3 | 8,314 | 11–12–1 (5–6–1) |
| February 1 | 7:05 pm | at St. Cloud State* | National Hockey Center • St. Cloud, Minnesota | Byrne | L 0–3 | 5,947 | 11–13–1 (5–6–1) |
| February 2 | 7:05 pm | at St. Cloud State* | National Hockey Center • St. Cloud, Minnesota | Byrne | L 2–7 | 6,029 | 11–14–1 (5–6–1) |
| February 8 | 7:05 pm | Findlay | Von Braun Center • Huntsville, Alabama | Byrne | W 5–4 | 1,963 | 12–14–1 (6–6–1) |
| February 9 | 7:05 pm | Findlay | Von Braun Center • Huntsville, Alabama | Byrne | W 4–2 | 2,102 | 13–14–1 (7–6–1) |
| February 15 | 8:05 pm | at Air Force | Cadet Ice Arena • Colorado Springs, Colorado | Byrne | L 3–6 | 1,783 | 13–15–1 (7–7–1) |
| February 16 | 8:05 pm | at Air Force | Cadet Ice Arena • Colorado Springs, Colorado | MacLean | L 5–6 | 2,035 | 13–16–1 (7–8–1) |
| February 22 | 6:05 pm | at Findlay | Clauss Ice Arena • Findlay, Ohio | Byrne | W 5–3 | 300 | 14–16–1 (8–8–1) |
| February 23 | 6:05 pm | at Findlay | Clauss Ice Arena • Findlay, Ohio | Byrne | L 2–6 | 800 | 14–17–1 (8–9–1) |
| March 8 | 7:05 pm | Bemidji State | Von Braun Center • Huntsville, Alabama | Byrne | W 5–2 | 1,993 | 15–17–1 (9–9–1) |
| March 9 | 7:05 pm | Bemidji State | Von Braun Center • Huntsville, Alabama | MacLean | W 5–3 | 2,283 | 16–17–1 (10–9–1) |
CHA Tournament
| March 14 | 2:30 pm | vs. Findlay* | Dwyer Arena • Lewiston, New York (CHA Tournament Quarterfinal) | Byrne | W 4–1 | N/A | 17–17–1 (10–9–1) |
| March 15 | 2:00 pm | vs. Bemidji State* | Dwyer Arena • Lewiston, New York (CHA Tournament Semifinal) | Byrne | W 5–2 | 479 | 18–17–1 (10–9–1) |
| March 16 | 6:00 pm | vs. Wayne State* | Dwyer Arena • Lewiston, New York (CHA Tournament Final) | Byrne | L 4–5 ^{OT} | 718 | 18–18–1 (10–9–1) |
*Non-conference game. All times are in Central Time.

=== Standings ===
2001–02 College Hockey America standings
| | Conference | | | | | | | Overall | | | | | |
| | GP | W | L | T | PTS | GF | GA | GP | W | L | T | GF | GA |
|---|---|---|---|---|---|---|---|---|---|---|---|---|---|
| Wayne State†* | 20 | 15 | 2 | 3 | 33 | 84 | 48 | 36 | 21 | 11 | 4 | 124 | 112 |
| Bemidji State | 19 | 8 | 7 | 4 | 22 | 65 | 61 | 35 | 12 | 18 | 5 | 116 | 146 |
| Alabama–Huntsville | 20 | 10 | 9 | 1 | 21 | 75 | 77 | 37 | 18 | 18 | 1 | 128 | 140 |
| Niagara | 19 | 8 | 10 | 1 | 19 | 61 | 65 | 35 | 17 | 17 | 1 | 120 | 118 |
| Air Force | 18 | 6 | 10 | 2 | 14 | 53 | 63 | 34 | 16 | 16 | 2 | 123 | 119 |
| Findlay | 20 | 5 | 14 | 1 | 11 | 57 | 81 | 35 | 11 | 22 | 2 | 105 | 140 |
Championship: Wayne State † indicates conference regular season champion * indicates conference tournament champion Final rankings: USA Today/USA Hockey Magazine Top 15 Poll

=== Statistics ===
==== Skaters ====
| Player | Pos | Yr | GP | G | A | Pts | PIM | PPG | SHG | GWG |
|---|---|---|---|---|---|---|---|---|---|---|
| Kārlis Zirnis | LW | Jr | 34 | 11 | 26 | 37 | 70 | 2 | 0 | 2 |
| Tyler Butler | D | Jr | 36 | 11 | 24 | 35 | 40 | 7 | 0 | 3 |
| Steve Charlebois | RW | Jr | 36 | 17 | 16 | 33 | 32 | 7 | 0 | 3 |
| Jason Hawes | C | Jr | 37 | 11 | 22 | 33 | 31 | 1 | 0 | 3 |
| Jared Ross | C | Fr | 36 | 11 | 17 | 28 | 8 | 4 | 0 | 3 |
| Craig Bushey | RW | Fr | 36 | 10 | 13 | 23 | 12 | 0 | 1 | 1 |
| Jessi Otis | LW | Sr | 36 | 7 | 15 | 22 | 22 | 3 | 0 | 1 |
| Joel Bresciani | RW | Jr | 37 | 11 | 10 | 21 | 124 | 1 | 0 | 1 |
| Ryan Leasa | D | Jr | 36 | 4 | 16 | 20 | 40 | 1 | 0 | 0 |
| Steve Milosevski | C | So | 36 | 9 | 9 | 18 | 8 | 0 | 1 | 1 |
| Keith Rowe | C | Fr | 37 | 8 | 5 | 13 | 44 | 3 | 0 | 0 |
| Jason Tinwick | LW | So | 36 | 6 | 7 | 13 | 8 | 0 | 0 | 0 |
| Kevin Ridgeway | D | Sr | 37 | 3 | 9 | 12 | 28 | 1 | 0 | 0 |
| Doug Watkins | D | Fr | 36 | 2 | 8 | 10 | 106 | 2 | 0 | 0 |
| Gerald Overton | LW | Jr | 31 | 2 | 6 | 8 | 12 | 1 | 0 | 0 |
| Jackson Harren | LW | So | 31 | 2 | 2 | 4 | 4 | 0 | 0 | 0 |
| Mike Funk | LW | Jr | 6 | 2 | 1 | 3 | 6 | 1 | 0 | 0 |
| David Halliwill | D | Jr | 30 | 1 | 2 | 3 | 23 | 0 | 0 | 0 |
| Ryan Brown | D | Fr | 22 | 0 | 3 | 3 | 6 | 0 | 0 | 0 |
| Mark Byrne | G | Jr | 25 | 0 | 2 | 2 | 4 | 0 | 0 | 0 |
| Mike Slaton | G | Jr | 2 | 0 | 0 | 0 | 0 | 0 | 0 | 0 |
| Blake Thompson | LW | Fr | 2 | 0 | 0 | 0 | 0 | 0 | 0 | 0 |
| Ian Fletcher | D | Jr | 4 | 0 | 0 | 0 | 10 | 0 | 0 | 0 |
| Adam MacLean | G | So | 14 | 0 | 0 | 0 | 10 | 0 | 0 | 0 |
| John Bradley | D | So | 24 | 0 | 0 | 0 | 0 | 0 | 0 | 0 |
| Team | | | 37 | 128 | 213 | 341 | 646 | 34 | 2 | 18 |

==== Goalies ====
| Player | Yr | GP | TOI | W | L | T | GA | GAA | SV | SV% | SO |
|---|---|---|---|---|---|---|---|---|---|---|---|
| Mark Byrne | Jr | 25 | 1435:45 | 13 | 11 | 0 | 82 | 3.43 | 731 | 0.899 | 1 |
| Adam MacLean | So | 14 | 724:19 | 5 | 7 | 1 | 51 | 4.22 | 342 | 0.870 | 1 |
| Mike Slaton | Jr | 2 | 69:16 | 0 | 0 | 0 | 5 | 4.33 | 21 | 0.808 | 0 |
