= 2000–01 Alabama–Huntsville Chargers men's ice hockey season =

American college ice hockey team season

2000–01 Alabama–Huntsville Chargers men's ice hockey

CHA Regular Season Champions
- Conference: College Hockey America
- Record: 21–12–1 (15–4–1 CHA)
- Head coach: Doug Ross (19th season)
- Assistant coach: Lance West
- Home stadium: Von Braun Center

The 2000–01 Alabama–Huntsville Chargers ice hockey team represented the University of Alabama in Huntsville in the 2000–01 NCAA Division I men's ice hockey season. The Chargers were coached by Doug Ross who was in his nineteenth season as head coach. The Chargers played their home games in the Von Braun Center and were members of the College Hockey America conference.

== Roster ==
No.	Nat.	Player	Class	Pos	Height	Weight	DoB	Hometown	Previous team
1		Mark Byrne	Sophomore	G	5' 10" (1.78 m)	170 lb (77 kg)	1978-03-22	Nepean, Ontario	Penticton (BCHL)
2		John Bradley	Freshman	D	6' 3" (1.91 m)	215 lb (98 kg)	1980-09-16	Hermantown, Minnesota	Billings (AWHL)
3		David Halliwill	Sophomore	D	6' 1" (1.85 m)	190 lb (86 kg)	1979-04-28	Windsor, Ontario	Chatham (GOJHL)
4		Kevin Ridgeway	Junior	D	6' 2" (1.88 m)	200 lb (91 kg)	1979-01-26	Ottawa, Ontario	Nepean (CJHL)
6		Ian Fletcher	Sophomore	D	6' 1" (1.85 m)	195 lb (88 kg)	1978-07-07	Delta, British Columbia	Victoria (BCHL)
7		Scott Campbell	Freshman	D	6' 1" (1.85 m)	195 lb (88 kg)	1981-07-01	Appin, Ontario	Petrolia (GOJHL)
8		Ryan Leasa	Sophomore	D	6' 1" (1.85 m)	175 lb (79 kg)	1980-05-18	Sarnia, Ontario	Sarnia (GOJHL)
9		Steve Charlebois	Sophomore	RW	5' 9" (1.75 m)	170 lb (77 kg)	1978-09-01	Carbon, Alberta	Penticton (BCHL)
10		Darren Curry	Senior	D	5' 11" (1.8 m)	190 lb (86 kg)	1977-03-10	Manotick, Ontario	Nepean (CJHL)
11		Jason Tinwick	Freshman	LW	5' 9" (1.75 m)	180 lb (82 kg)	1979-01-23	Tecumseh, Ontario	Tecumseh (WOHL)
12		Jackson Harren	Freshman	LW	6' 2" (1.88 m)	205 lb (93 kg)	1980-03-10	Warroad, Minnesota	Dubuque (USHL)
14		Ron Baker	Junior	C	6' 1" (1.85 m)	180 lb (82 kg)	1977-02-02	Oshawa, Ontario	Milton (OJHL)
15		Jessi Otis	Junior	LW	6' 1" (1.85 m)	190 lb (86 kg)	1978-03-04	Calgary, Alberta	Portage (MJHL)
16		Dwayne Blais	Senior	C	5' 9" (1.75 m)	180 lb (82 kg)	1977-07-12	Sudbury, Ontario	Markham (OJHL)
17		Steve Milosevski	Freshman	C	6' 1" (1.85 m)	170 lb (77 kg)	1978-12-18	Windsor, Ontario	Tecumseh (WOHL)
18		Gerald Overton	Sophomore	LW	5' 10" (1.78 m)	175 lb (79 kg)	1978-08-24	150 Mile House, British Columbia	Quesnel (BCHL)
19		Jason Hawes	Sophomore	C	5' 11" (1.8 m)	190 lb (86 kg)	1978-06-16	Perth, Ontario	Brockville (CCHL)
20		Joel Bresciani	Sophomore	RW	6' 1" (1.85 m)	200 lb (91 kg)	1978-08-17	Sherwood Park, Alberta	Vernon (BCHL)
21		Ryan McCormack	Senior	RW	6' 1" (1.85 m)	180 lb (82 kg)	1978-03-04	Thunder Bay, Ontario	Portage (MJHL)
22		Mike Funk	Sophomore	LW	6' 1" (1.85 m)	195 lb (88 kg)	1978-11-19	Newton, Manitoba	Portage (MJHL)
23		James Kodrowski	Junior	D	5' 11" (1.8 m)	200 lb (91 kg)	1979-09-26	Morristown, New Jersey	Great Falls (AFHL)
25		Kārlis Zirnis	Sophomore	LW	5' 11" (1.8 m)	185 lb (84 kg)	1977-11-02	Riga, Latvia	Gaylord (NAHL)
27		Tyler Butler	Sophomore	D	6' 2" (1.88 m)	190 lb (86 kg)	1979-07-08	Kanata, Ontario	Kanata Valley (CJHL)
30		Adam MacLean	Freshman	G	5' 11" (1.8 m)	160 lb (73 kg)	1980-07-04	Woodstock, Ontario	St. Marys (WOHL)
35		Mike Slaton	Sophomore	G	5' 9" (1.75 m)	180 lb (82 kg)	1978-06-24	Plymouth, Minnesota	Bozeman (AWHL)

== Season ==
=== Schedule ===
Date	Time	Opponent	Site	Decision	Result	Attendance	Record
Regular Season
October 13	7:00 pm	Bowling Green*	Von Braun Center • Huntsville, Alabama	Byrne	W 3–0	2,045	1–0–0
October 14	7:00 pm	Bowling Green*	Von Braun Center • Huntsville, Alabama	Byrne	W 2–0	1,836	2–0–0
October 20	6:05 pm	at Western Michigan*	Lawson Ice Arena • Kalamazoo, Michigan	Byrne	W 6–5 ^{OT}	2,203	3–0–0
October 21	6:05 pm	at Western Michigan*	Lawson Ice Arena • Kalamazoo, Michigan	Byrne	L 3–4	1,921	3–1–0
October 27	7:35 pm	at Bemidji State	John S. Glas Field House • Bemidji, Minnesota	Byrne	W 5–4	1,024	4–1–0 (1–0–0)
October 28	7:05 pm	at Bemidji State	John S. Glas Field House • Bemidji, Minnesota	Byrne	W 4–2	1,025	5–1–0 (2–0–0)
November 3	7:00 pm	Iona*	Von Braun Center • Huntsville, Alabama	Byrne	W 4–0	2,194	6–1–0 (2–0–0)
November 4	7:00 pm	Iona*	Von Braun Center • Huntsville, Alabama	MacLean	W 4–2	2,179	7–1–0 (2–0–0)
November 17	7:00 pm	Niagara	Von Braun Center • Huntsville, Alabama	Byrne	W 5–3	2,483	8–1–0 (3–0–0)
November 18	7:00 pm	Niagara	Von Braun Center • Huntsville, Alabama	Byrne	L 0–3	1,511	8–2–0 (3–1–0)
December 1	6:00 pm	at Niagara	Dwyer Arena • Lewiston, New York	Byrne	L 2–4	1,160	8–3–0 (3–2–0)
December 2	6:00 pm	at Niagara	Dwyer Arena • Lewiston, New York	MacLean	L 0–2	1,169	8–4–0 (3–3–0)
December 8	7:35 pm	at MSU–Mankato*	Midwest Wireless Civic Center • Mankato, Minnesota	Byrne	L 2–4	3,112	8–5–0 (3–3–0)
December 9	7:05 pm	at MSU–Mankato*	Midwest Wireless Civic Center • Mankato, Minnesota	MacLean	L 2–3	3,033	8–6–0 (3–3–0)
December 29	7:00 pm	Canisius*	Von Braun Center • Huntsville, Alabama (SCI Holiday Shootout Semifinal)	Byrne	L 2–4	1,807	8–7–0 (3–3–0)
December 30	4:00 pm	UMass Lowell*	Von Braun Center • Huntsville, Alabama (SCI Holiday Shootout Consolation)	Byrne	L 1–5	1,840	8–8–0 (3–3–0)
January 5	6:05 pm	at Wayne State	Great Lakes Sports City Superior Arena • Fraser, Michigan	Byrne	W 5–0	643	9–8–0 (4–3–0)
January 6	6:05 pm	at Wayne State	Great Lakes Sports City Superior Arena • Fraser, Michigan	Byrne	W 4–2	313	10–8–0 (5–3–0)
January 12	7:00 pm	Findlay	Von Braun Center • Huntsville, Alabama	Byrne	W 5–1	1,886	11–8–0 (6–3–0)
January 13	1:00 pm	Findlay	Von Braun Center • Huntsville, Alabama	Byrne	T 3–3 ^{OT}	1,130	11–8–1 (6–3–1)
January 19	7:00 pm	Air Force	Von Braun Center • Huntsville, Alabama	Byrne	W 4–0	2,214	12–8–1 (7–3–1)
January 20	7:00 pm	Air Force	Von Braun Center • Huntsville, Alabama	Byrne	W 5–3	3,646	13–8–1 (8–3–1)
January 26	8:35 pm	at Denver*	Magness Arena • Denver, Colorado	Byrne	L 0–4	6,091	13–9–1 (8–3–1)
January 28	2:05 pm	at Denver*	Magness Arena • Denver, Colorado	Byrne	L 0–3	3,584	13–10–1 (8–3–1)
February 2	7:00 pm	Bemidji State	Von Braun Center • Huntsville, Alabama	Byrne	W 3–2	1,945	14–10–1 (9–3–1)
February 3	7:00 pm	Bemidji State	Von Braun Center • Huntsville, Alabama	Byrne	W 2–1	1,950	15–10–1 (10–3–1)
February 9	7:00 pm	Wayne State	Von Braun Center • Huntsville, Alabama	Byrne	W 8–5	1,660	16–10–1 (11–3–1)
February 10	1:00 pm	Wayne State	Von Braun Center • Huntsville, Alabama	Byrne	W 6–3	1,303	17–10–1 (12–3–1)
February 16	8:05 pm	at Air Force	Cadet Ice Arena • Colorado Springs, Colorado	Byrne	W 5–4 ^{OT}	1,696	18–10–1 (13–3–1)
February 17	6:05 pm	at Air Force	Cadet Ice Arena • Colorado Springs, Colorado	MacLean	W 4–2	2,289	19–10–1 (14–3–1)
February 23	6:05 pm	at Findlay	Clauss Ice Arena • Findlay, Ohio	Byrne	L 4–5 ^{OT}	500	19–11–1 (14–4–1)
February 24	6:05 pm	at Findlay	Clauss Ice Arena • Findlay, Ohio	MacLean	W 4–0	425	20–11–1 (15–4–1)
CHA Tournament
March 9	7:05 pm	Air Force*	Von Braun Center • Huntsville, Alabama (CHA Tournament Semifinal)	Byrne	W 7–0	1,436	21–11–1 (15–4–1)
March 10	7:05 pm	Wayne State*	Von Braun Center • Huntsville, Alabama (CHA Tournament Final)	Byrne	L 1–4	1,892	21–12–1 (15–4–1)
*Non-conference game. All times are in Central Time.

=== Standings ===
2000–01 College Hockey America standings
	Conference							Overall					
	GP	W	L	T	PTS	GF	GA	GP	W	L	T	GF	GA
Alabama–Huntsville†	20	15	4	1	31	78	49	34	21	12	1	115	87
Niagara	20	10	7	3	23	59	52	38	14	19	5	97	105
Wayne State*	20	8	9	3	19	59	68	35	18	14	3	114	104
Air Force	19	6	9	4	18	51	61	37	16	17	4	114	109
Findlay	20	8	10	2	18	57	63	27	10	15	2	66	92
Bemidji State	19	4	12	3	11	51	62	34	4	26	4	77	133
Championship: Wayne State † indicates conference regular season champion * indicates conference tournament champion Final rankings: USA Today/USA Hockey Magazine Top 15 Poll

=== Statistics ===
==== Skaters ====
Player	Pos	Yr	GP	G	A	Pts	PIM	PPG	SHG	GWG
Kārlis Zirnis	LW	So	34	15	16	31	101	5	0	3
Dwayne Blais	C	Sr	34	7	24	31	62	2	0	2
Ryan McCormack	RW	Sr	34	13	16	29	50	6	1	3
Ron Baker	C	Jr	34	13	14	27	90	7	0	3
Jessi Otis	LW	Jr	34	12	14	26	42	4	2	2
Darren Curry	D	Sr	34	8	18	26	38	3	0	2
Mike Funk	LW	So	34	11	8	19	36	6	0	3
Steve Charlebois	RW	So	31	9	7	16	30	0	3	1
Ian Fletcher	D	So	34	5	10	15	32	2	0	0
Joel Bresciani	RW	So	34	6	8	14	66	1	0	2
Jason Hawes	C	So	34	4	8	12	28	0	0	0
Tyler Butler	D	So	33	3	9	12	60	0	1	0
Kevin Ridgeway	D	Jr	30	4	4	8	28	0	0	0
Gerald Overton	LW	So	34	1	7	8	33	0	0	0
Ryan Leasa	D	So	32	0	8	8	56	0	0	0
Steve Milosevski	C	Fr	31	1	3	4	20	0	0	0
David Halliwill	D	So	30	0	3	3	14	0	0	0
Jason Tinwick	LW	Fr	23	2	0	2	6	1	0	0
Scott Campbell	D	Fr	6	1	0	1	4	0	0	0
Jackson Harren	LW	Fr	19	0	1	1	0	0	0	0
Mark Byrne	G	So	29	0	1	1	2	0	0	0
Mike Slaton	G	So	1	0	0	0	0	0	0	0
Adam MacLean	G	Fr	6	0	0	0	0	0	0	0
Team			34	115	179	294	798	37	7	21

==== Goalies ====
Player	Yr	GP	TOI	W	L	T	GA	GAA	SV	SV%	SO
Mark Byrne	So	29	1720:21	18	10	1	72	2.51	681	0.904	6
Adam MacLean	Fr	6	319:00	3	2	0	12	2.26	111	0.902	1
Mike Slaton	So	1	4:03	0	0	0	0	0.00	0	0.000	0
