= Craig Barnett (ice hockey) =

Canadian former Ice Hockey player

Biographical details
- Born: March 26, 1965 (age 61); Oakville, Ontario, Canada
- Education: SUNY-Plattsburgh

Playing career
- 1981–1984: Oakville Blades
- 1984–1989: SUNY-Plattsburgh
- 1989–1990: Flint Spirits
- 1989–1991: Erie Panthers
- Position: Goaltender

Coaching career (HC unless noted)
- 1991–1993: Mercyhurst (Assistant)
- 1993–1994: Kent State (Assistant)
- 1995–2003: Findlay
- 2003–2004: Lake Forest Academy
- 2004–2006: Becker College (AD)
- 2006–2009: Mercyhurst (AD)
- 2011–2014: American Lacrosse Conference (Commissioner)
- 2012–present: NAHL (Dir. of Player Personnel)
- 2013–2016: Cathedral Prep
- 2014–2018: MIVA (Commissioner)
- 2016–2018: PIHL (Commissioner)

Head coaching record
- Overall: 89–112–12 (.446) (college)

Craig Barnett is a Canadian ice hockey former player and head coach and current Commissioner of both the Midwestern Intercollegiate Volleyball Association and Pennsylvania Interscholastic Hockey League as well as the director of player personnel for the North American Hockey League.

== Career ==
Craig Barnett began his college career at SUNY-Plattsburgh in 1984 after spending three seasons with the Oakville Blades. After redshirting his first year he joined the Cardinals and helped them to their first title game in 1986 as well as a national title the following year. Though the championship was later vacated Barnett had already embarked on his professional career. After two years as a minor-leaguer (mostly for the ECHL's Erie Panthers) Barnett retired as a player and began his coaching career.

Barnett's first gig came with Mercyhurst as both an assistant coach and director of the Mercyhurst Ice Center. After two years he transitioned to Division I Kent State, again as an assistant, before being hired by Findlay as the program's first head coach. The Oilers started as a Division II program in 1996, playing as an independent squad for two years before joining the MCHA as a founding member and winning the first conference title in 1998–99 with a 23–5 record. After their first successful season Findlay was a surprise addition to the premier lineup of College Hockey America when it began play in 1999 not the least due to the fact that the NCAA mandates a 9-year waiting period for teams playing in divisions above their level. Regardless of the trouble Barnett soldiered on behind the Findlay bench, finishing with poor but respectable results each year. While the Oilers were automatic qualifiers for the conference tournament each year (as all member teams were) he failed in each of his four attempts to win a single game, losing in the quarterfinal round each time. In the summer of 2003 the University of Findlay administration changed and consequently, after eight years in Findlay, Craig Barnett resigned as coach to take over at Lake Forest Academy. Anyone left wondering why he resigned had their answer the following January when the school announced the program would revert to club status.

Barnett spent only one year in Lake Forest before returning to the college ranks, this time as the Athletic Director for Becker College. Two years later he returned to his old stomping grounds in Erie, Pennsylvania as the AD for Mercyhurst. in 2011 he assumed the role as commissioner of the American Lacrosse Conference, remaining with the league until it was absorbed by the Big Ten in 2014. During his time with the ALC Barnett was tabbed by the North American Hockey League as coordinator of player personnel for both the NA3HL and NAPHL eventually working up to become director of player personnel for the NAHL. Barnett also returned to coaching in 2013, accepting the job at Cathedral Prep (with whom he won a state title in 2015) and three years later became the commissioner of the entire state ice hockey league. Barnett has also served as commissioner of the Midwestern Intercollegiate Volleyball Association since 2014. (as of 2016)

== Head coaching record ==
=== College ===
Record table
Season	Team	Overall	Conference	Standing	Postseason
Findlay Oilers Independent (1996–1998)
1996–97	Findlay	15–11–3			
1997–98	Findlay	11–16–1			
Findlay:		26–27–4			
Findlay Oilers (MCHA) (1998–1999)
1998–99	Findlay	23–5–0	11–0–0	1st	MCHA Tournament Champion
Findlay:		23–5–0			
Findlay Oilers (CHA) (1999–2003)
1999–00	Findlay	9–22–0	4–14–0	5th	CHA Quarterfinals
2000–01	Findlay	10–15–2	8–10–2	t-4th	CHA Quarterfinals
2001–02	Findlay	11–22–2	5–14–1	6th	CHA Quarterfinals
2002–03	Findlay	10–21–4	3–13–4	5th	CHA Quarterfinals
Findlay:		40–80–8	20–51–7		
Total:		89–112–12			
National champion Postseason invitational champion Conference regular season champion Conference regular season and conference tournament champion Division regular season champion Division regular season and conference tournament champion Conference tournament champion
