= Pat Ford (ice hockey) =

Biographical details
- Born: October 3, 1964 (age 62); Saskatoon, Saskatchewan, Canada
- Education: Wisconsin

Playing career
- 1983–1984: Yorkton Terriers
- 1984–1988: Wisconsin
- 1988–1989: Canadian National Team
- 1989–1990: Swindon Wildcats
- Position: Center

Coaching career (HC unless noted)
- 1990–1992: Madison Edgewood (Assistant)
- 1992–1994: Northern Michigan (Assistant)
- 1994–2002: Wisconsin (Assistant)
- 2002–2003: Findlay (Associate)
- 2003–2004: Findlay

Head coaching record
- Overall: 11–22–5 (.355)

Pat Ford is a Canadian retired ice hockey player and head coach, most recently leading the Findlay Oilers in their final season as a Division I program.

== Career ==
Pat Ford played four years at Wisconsin in the mid 1980s, winning the WCHA tournament in his senior season. After graduating with a degree in bacteriology Ford briefly was a member of both the Canadian National Team and Swindon Wildcats before retiring as a player.

In 1990 he started his coaching career as an assistant at Madison Edgewood while also working as a graduate assistant with his alma mater. He became a full-time assistant with Northern Michigan in 1992 and two years later returned to Madison to take the same position with the Badgers. In the summer of 2002 Ford was hired as an associate coach for Findlay shortly after his former boss Jeff Sauer announced his retirement. While things appeared to be heading in the right direction for Ford, a year later the administration at Findlay changed and he soon was named as head coach after former bench boss Craig Barnett resigned. by January the following year Findlay announced that the team would be reduced to club status once more but Ford provided one final achievement for the program, winning their only playoff game in the 2004 CHA Men's Ice Hockey Tournament. Rather than continue to search for coaching opportunities Ford hung up his whistle after the season was over and continued his career working for Hellenbrand Water, a company in Waunakee, Wisconsin.

== Personal life ==
Pat Ford has three sons with his wife Cammie, Jason, Keegan and Kevin. Jason is entering his junior year with Wisconsin. Keegan had attended Wisconsin in 2014 but, after playing only twelve games, left the program and transferred to Michigan Tech where he is set to begin playing in the fall of 2016. Kevin is currently playing junior hockey for the Kirkland Lake Gold Miners. (as of 2016)

== Head coaching record ==
Record table
Season	Team	Overall	Conference	Standing	Postseason
Findlay Oilers (CHA) (2003–2004)
2003–04	Findlay	11–22–5	7–11–2	4th	CHA Semifinals
Findlay:		11–22–5	7–11–2		
Total:		11–22–5			
National champion Postseason invitational champion Conference regular season champion Conference regular season and conference tournament champion Division regular season champion Division regular season and conference tournament champion Conference tournament champion
