= 2002 CHA men's ice hockey tournament =

2002 CHA Men's ice hockey tournament
- Dates: March 14–16, 2002
- Teams: 6
- Finals site: Dwyer Arena; Lewiston, New York
- Champions: Wayne State (2nd title)
- Winning coach: Bill Wilkinson (2nd title)
- MVP: Dustin Kingston (Wayne State)
- CHA Men's Ice Hockey Tournaments

The 2002 CHA Men's Ice Hockey Tournament was the 3rd tournament in conference history and was played between March 14 and March 16, 2002 at Dwyer Arena in Lewiston, New York, United States. Wayne State defeated Alabama-Huntsville 5–4 in overtime in the championship game to win the tournament for the second consecutive year.

== Format ==
The tournament featured six teams for the first time. The top two teams from the regular season received byes to the semifinals where they played the winners from the quarterfinal games. The two semifinal winners met in the championship game on March 16, 2002.

=== Conference standings ===
Note: GP = Games played; W = Wins; L = Losses; T = Ties; PTS = Points; GF = Goals For; GA = Goals Against

2001–02 College Hockey America standings
| | Conference | | | | | | | Overall | | | | | |
| | GP | W | L | T | PTS | GF | GA | GP | W | L | T | GF | GA |
|---|---|---|---|---|---|---|---|---|---|---|---|---|---|
| Wayne State†* | 20 | 15 | 2 | 3 | 33 | 84 | 48 | 36 | 21 | 11 | 4 | 124 | 112 |
| Bemidji State | 19 | 8 | 7 | 4 | 22 | 65 | 61 | 35 | 12 | 18 | 5 | 116 | 146 |
| Alabama–Huntsville | 20 | 10 | 9 | 1 | 21 | 75 | 77 | 37 | 18 | 18 | 1 | 128 | 140 |
| Niagara | 19 | 8 | 10 | 1 | 19 | 61 | 65 | 35 | 17 | 17 | 1 | 120 | 118 |
| Air Force | 18 | 6 | 10 | 2 | 14 | 53 | 63 | 34 | 16 | 16 | 2 | 123 | 119 |
| Findlay | 20 | 5 | 14 | 1 | 11 | 57 | 81 | 35 | 11 | 22 | 2 | 105 | 140 |
Championship: Wayne State † indicates conference regular season champion * indicates conference tournament champion Final rankings: USA Today/USA Hockey Magazine Top 15 Poll

== Bracket ==
Quarterfinal

March 14, 2002

Semifinals

March 15, 2002

Championship

March 16, 2002

1
Wayne State
3

4
Niagara
3

5
Air Force
1

5
Air Force
5

1
Wayne State
5*

3
Alabama-Huntsville
4

2
Bemidji State
2

3
Alabama-Huntsville
4

3
Alabama-Huntsville
5

6
Findlay
1

Note: * denotes overtime period(s)

== Tournament awards ==
=== All-Star team ===
- Goaltender: Mark Byrne (Alabama-Huntsville)
- Defensemen: Tyler Butler (Alabama-Huntsville), Tyler Kindle (Wayne State)
- Forwards: Andy Berg (Air Force), Steve Charlebois (Alabama-Huntsville), Jason Durbin (Wayne State)

=== MVP ===
- Dustin Kingston (Wayne State)
