= Waunakee, Wisconsin =

- Village
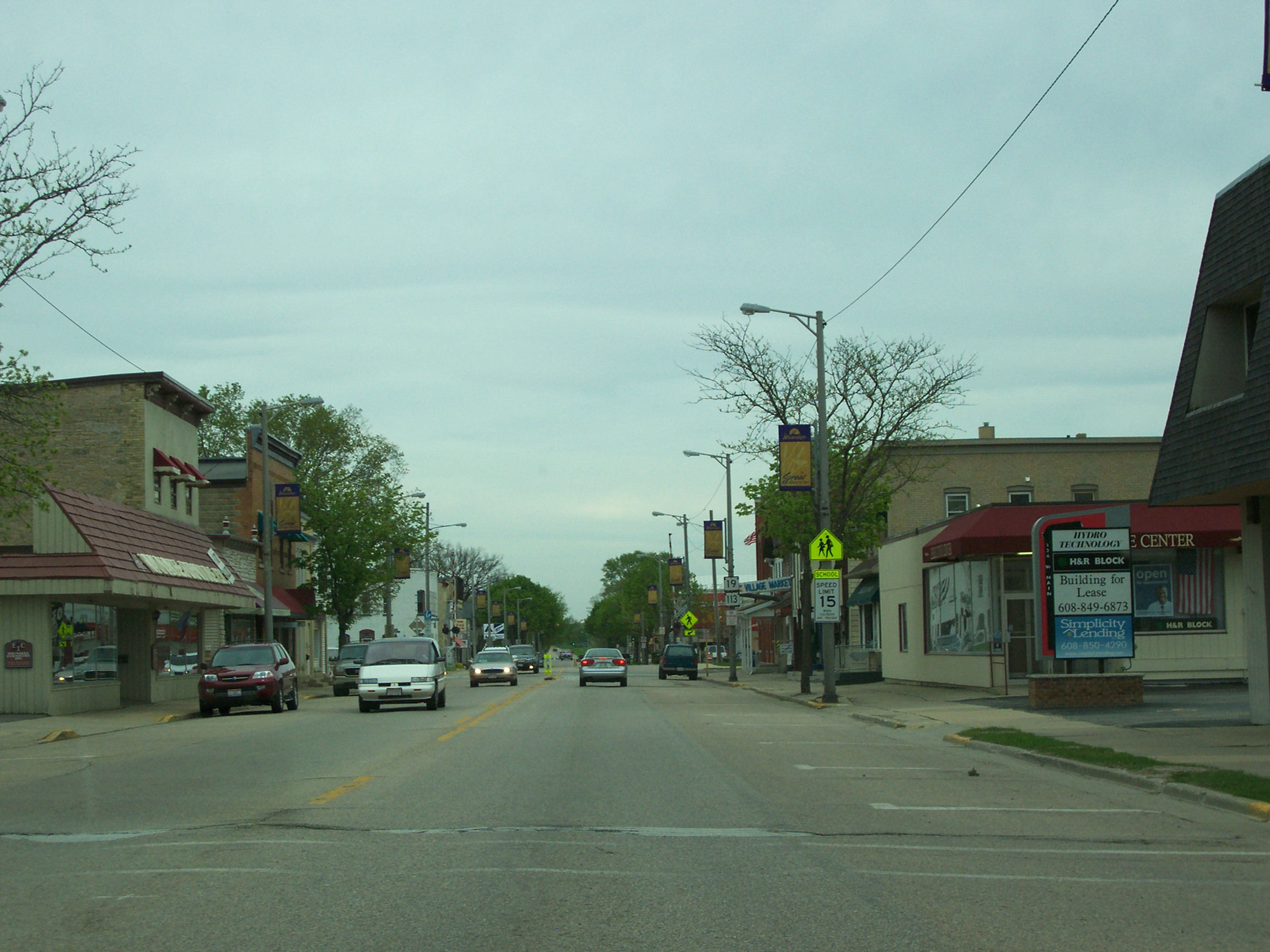
- Downtown Waunakee on Wisconsin Highway 19
- Motto: The Only Waunakee in the World
- Interactive map of Waunakee, Wisconsin
- Location within Wisconsin Location within the United States
- Coordinates: 43°11′14″N 89°27′8″W
- Country: United States
- State: Wisconsin
- County: Dane

Government
  - Type: Village Board
  - Village President: Kristin Runge

Area
  - Total: 7.17 sq mi (18.58 km^{2})
  - Land: 7.17 sq mi (18.57 km^{2})
  - Water: 0.0039 sq mi (0.01 km^{2})
- Elevation: 928 ft (283 m)

Population (2020)
  - Total: 14,879
  - Estimate (2025): 16,411
  - Density: 1,959.9/sq mi (756.74/km^{2})
- Time zone: UTC−6 (Central (CST))
  - Summer (DST): UTC−5 (CDT)
- ZIP Code: 53597
- Area code: 608
- FIPS code: 55-84350
- GNIS feature ID: 1576318
- Website: www.waunakee.gov

Waunakee (/ˌwɔːnəˈkiː/) is a village in Dane County, Wisconsin, United States. The population was 14,879 at the 2020 census. A suburb of Madison, it is part of the Madison metropolitan area. Waunakee bills itself as "The Only Waunakee in the World".

== History ==
When the Chicago and Northwestern Railway wanted to expand its line from Madison to Saint Paul, a door was opened for the development of a town. Its original location was intended to be at Packham's Mill, about where Mill Road crosses the railroad track today two miles southeast of downtown. But two local settlers, Louis Baker and George Fish, platted a village on their land two miles further northwest along the railroad. Railroad officials agreed to move a train depot to the new community in exchange for $1,500 and two miles of right of way. The village was founded in 1871 and formally incorporated in 1893.

Baker and Fish did not want credit for naming the community, so they asked Simeon Mills and a Mr. Hill of Madison to come up with a list. The name "Waunakee" has a Native American origin meaning "fair and pleasant valley." In their "Dictionary of Wisconsin History", on the other hand, the Wisconsin Historical Society has the village's name deriving from the Chippewa name of "a friendly Indian" from the area, "Waunaki", meaning "he lives in peace".

Robert F. Kennedy and Ted Kennedy each visited the village to campaign for their brother John before the contested Wisconsin presidential primary in March 1960. Former First Lady Barbara Bush visited the village to campaign for her son George for president in October 2000. In October 2024, Donald Trump held a rally in the village at Dane Manufacturing, the first visit by a Republican presidential nominee to Dane County since 1996.

The landmark Waunakee Railroad Depot, in the central part of town, is listed on the National Register of Historic Places. It now houses the Waunakee Area Chamber of Commerce offices.

== Geography ==
Waunakee is located at 43°11′14″N 89°27′8″W (43.187253, −89.452244).

According to the United States Census Bureau, the village has an area of 6.39 square miles (16.55 km^{2}), of which 6.38 square miles (16.52 km^{2}) is land and 0.01 square miles (0.03 km^{2}) is water.

The village is bordered on the south and east by Westport, to the north by Vienna, to the northwest by Dane, and to the west by Springfield.

Six Mile Creek, the main waterway through the community, runs west to east before making a southerly turn through the village on its way to Lake Mendota.

== Demographics ==
Historical population
Census	Pop.	Note	%±
1880	279		—
1890	312		11.8%
1900	443		42.0%
1910	550		24.2%
1920	560		1.8%
1930	640		14.3%
1940	773		20.8%
1950	1,042		34.8%
1960	1,611		54.6%
1970	2,181		35.4%
1980	3,866		77.3%
1990	5,897		52.5%
2000	8,995		52.5%
2010	12,097		34.5%
2020	14,879		23.0%
2025 (est.)	16,411		10.3%
U.S. Decennial Census

=== 2020 census ===
As of the 2020 census, Waunakee had a population of 14,879. The median age was 39.6 years. 29.0% of residents were under the age of 18 and 13.8% of residents were 65 years of age or older. For every 100 females there were 96.0 males, and for every 100 females age 18 and over there were 93.3 males age 18 and over.

98.3% of residents lived in urban areas, while 1.7% lived in rural areas.

There were 5,348 households in Waunakee, of which 42.5% had children under the age of 18 living in them. Of all households, 64.7% were married-couple households, 11.8% were households with a male householder and no spouse or partner present, and 18.5% were households with a female householder and no spouse or partner present. About 20.0% of all households were made up of individuals and 9.8% had someone living alone who was 65 years of age or older.

There were 5,537 housing units, of which 3.4% were vacant. The homeowner vacancy rate was 0.4% and the rental vacancy rate was 6.4%.

Racial composition as of the 2020 census
Race	Number	Percent
White	13,206	88.8%
Black or African American	194	1.3%
American Indian and Alaska Native	23	0.2%
Asian	395	2.7%
Native Hawaiian and Other Pacific Islander	3	0.0%
Some other race	194	1.3%
Two or more races	864	5.8%
Hispanic or Latino (of any race)	595	4.0%

=== 2010 census ===
As of the census of 2010, there were 12,097 people, 4,344 households, and 3,316 families living in the village. The population density was 1,896.1 inhabitants per square mile (732.1/km^{2}). There were 4,483 housing units at an average density of 702.7 per square mile (271.3/km^{2}). The racial makeup of the village was 95.8% White, 1.0% African American, 0.2% Native American, 1.2% Asian, 0.5% from other races, and 1.3% from two or more races. Hispanic or Latino people of any race were 2.2% of the population.

There were 4,344 households, of which 45.3% had children under the age of 18 living with them, 64.3% were married couples living together, 8.8% had a female householder with no husband present, 3.3% had a male householder with no wife present, and 23.7% were non-families. 19.5% of all households were made up of individuals, and 8.4% had someone living alone who was 65 years of age or older. The average household size was 2.76 and the average family size was 3.20.

The median age in the village was 37.9 years. 31.6% of residents were under the age of 18; 5.3% were between the ages of 18 and 24; 25.8% were from 25 to 44; 27.5% were from 45 to 64; and 9.9% were 65 years of age or older. The gender makeup of the village was 48.8% male and 51.2% female.

=== 2000 census ===
As of the census of 2000, there were 8,995 people, 3,203 households, and 2,379 families living in the village. The population density was 1,509.9 people per square mile (582.7/km^{2}). There were 3,295 housing units at an average density of 553.1 per square mile (213.5/km^{2}). The racial makeup of the village was 98.07% White, 0.36% African American, 0.08% Native American, 0.51% Asian, 0.01% Pacific Islander, 0.24% from other races, and 0.73% from two or more races. Hispanic or Latino people of any race were 0.96% of the population.

There were 3,203 households, out of which 46.3% had children under the age of 18 living with them, 63.3% were married couples living together, 8.5% had a female householder with no husband present, and 25.7% were non-families. 20.2% of all households were made up of individuals, and 8.9% had someone living alone who was 65 years of age or older. The average household size was 2.76 and the average family size was 3.23.

In the village, the population was spread out, with 32.1% under the age of 18, 6.3% from 18 to 24, 33.4% from 25 to 44, 18.6% from 45 to 64, and 9.5% who were 65 years of age or older. The median age was 35 years. For every 100 females, there were 94.8 males. For every 100 females age 18 and over, there were 90.2 males.

The median income for a household in the village was $59,225, and the median income for a family was $67,894. Males had a median income of $45,053 versus $30,163 for females. The per capita income for the village was $25,952. About 0.4% of families and 1.7% of the population were below the poverty line, including 0.4% of those under age 18 and 2.0% of those age 65 or over.

== Economy ==
Waunakee added a local Village Center in 2006 that acts as a nucleus for the community. It has a fitness center, senior center, meeting rooms, and a gymnasium. The Waunakee Business Park is a 160-acre (0.65 km^{2}) business park development that hosts large and small business operations. Recent years have seen two redevelopments and two new apartment buildings on Main Street, a reconstruction and new streetscape on both Main Street and Century Avenue, a mural on the Waunakee Furniture building, and annual public art displays.

As of 2018, the top employers in the village are:

#	Employer	Full-time employees
1	Waunakee Community School District	575
2	NORD Gear	310
3	Uniek Plastics	300
4	Octopi Brewing	250
5	Suttle-Straus, Inc.	200
6	Scientific Protein Laboratories	198
7	Waunakee Manor, HCC	158
8	Piggly Wiggly	145
9	GFL Environmental	115
10	Dane Manufacturing	100

== Government ==
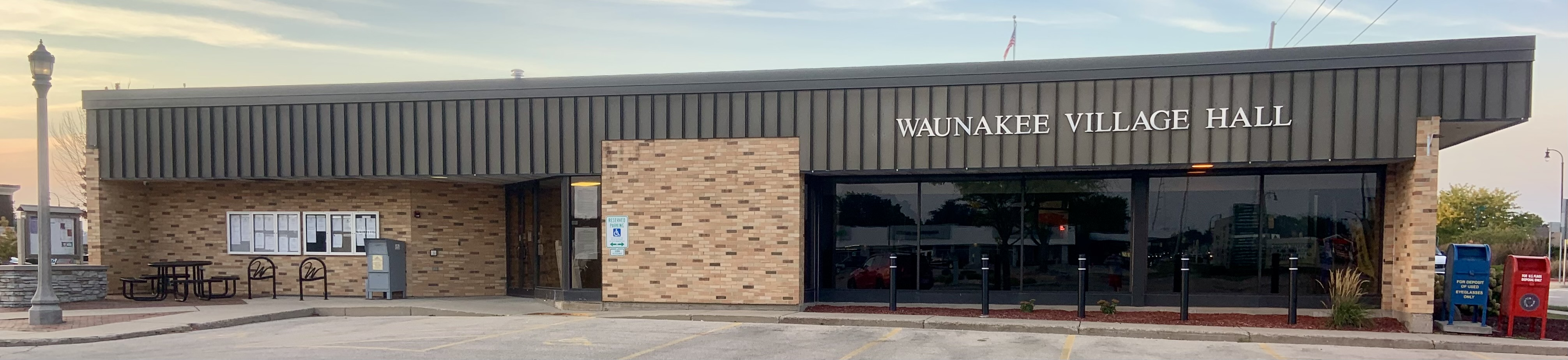
Waunakee Village Hall

Waunakee is governed by a board consisting of a president and six trustees. The president and trustees are elected to two-year terms during spring elections. The Village President of Waunakee since April 2023 is Kristin Runge.

The village is represented in the Wisconsin State Assembly by Alex Joers and in the State Senate by Dianne Hesselbein. The village's representative on the Dane County Board is David Boetcher.

Waunakee Village Presidents
Village President	Tenure
Henry Heller	1893–1899
Jacob Buhlman	1900–1901
Lawrence Freney	1901–1904
Henry Heller	1904–1906
J.P. O'Malley	1906–1908
George E. Lester	1908–1909
Almon W. Cameron	1909–1914
Herman J. Doll	1914–1924
J.H. Koltes	1924–1927
Roy W. Cameron	1927–1931
Julius Diederich	1931–1934
Herman J. Doll	1934–1941
Julius Diederich	1941–1947
Roy W. Cameron	1947–1951
Harvey Solveson	1951–1953
Francis Bowles	1953–1955
Roy W. Cameron	1955–1957
Joseph Hellenbrand	1957–1965
Peter Barbian	1965–1967
Ed Hellenbrand	1967–1973
Allan Dittman	1973–1975
Ann Helt	1975–1981
Math Laufenberg	1981–1987
Tom Marx	1987–1990
Maureen O'Malley	1990–1995
Tom Marx	1995–1997
Tim Nixon	1997–2001
Rich Murphy	2001–2003
John Laubmeier	2003–2015
Chris Zellner	2015–2023
Kristin Runge	2023–present

=== Election results ===
Waunakee village vote by party in presidential elections
Year	Democratic	Republican	Third parties
2024	62.46% 6,433	35.95% 3,703	1.90% 196
2020	63.10% 5,952	35.20% 3,324	1.70% 159
2016	56.50% 4,354	36.90% 2,842	6.60% 512
2012	55.50% 4,059	43.82% 3,202	
2008	58.75% 3,880	40.14% 2,651	
2004	50.33% 2,988	49.00% 2,909	
2000	57.08% 2,659	40.62% 1,892	2.30% 107
1996	50.93% 1,725	41.30% 1,399	7.76% 263
1992	42.97% 1,411	38.67% 1,270	18.36% 603
1988	50.53% 1,234	49.47% 1,208	
1984	45.99% 946	54.01% 1,111	
1980	55.65% 960	44.35% 765	
1976	56.32% 815	43.68% 632	
1972	54.26% 630	45.74% 531	
1968	61.11% 539	36.51% 322	2.38% 21
1964	80.79% 656	19.21% 156	
1960	69.44% 500	30.56% 220	
1956	42.81% 247	56.67% 327	
1952	41.80% 232	58.20% 323	
1948	60.55% 264	38.30% 167	
1944	53.05% 209	46.95% 185	
1940	61.32% 241	38.68% 152	
1936	73.35% 256	24.07% 167	
1932	79.64% 262	20.36% 67	
1928	76.20% 269	23.80% 84	
1924	8.27% 23	23.74% 66	67.99% 189
1920	13.92% 33	86.08% 204	

== Education ==
Waunakee is served by the Waunakee Community School District, whose schools include:

- Arboretum Elementary School (serves eastern/southeastern part of school district)
- Heritage Elementary School (serves southern and central part of school district)
- Prairie Elementary School (serves northern and western part of school district)
- Waunakee Intermediate School
- Waunakee Community Middle School
- Waunakee Community High School

The three public elementary schools serve students from kindergarten through 4th grade, the intermediate school 5th and 6th grades, the middle school 7th and 8th grades, and the high school grades 9 through 12. The community broke ground to build a new middle school in September 2024, which officially opened in early fall 2026.

Private schools include St. John the Baptist Catholic School and Madison Country Day School.

== Transportation ==
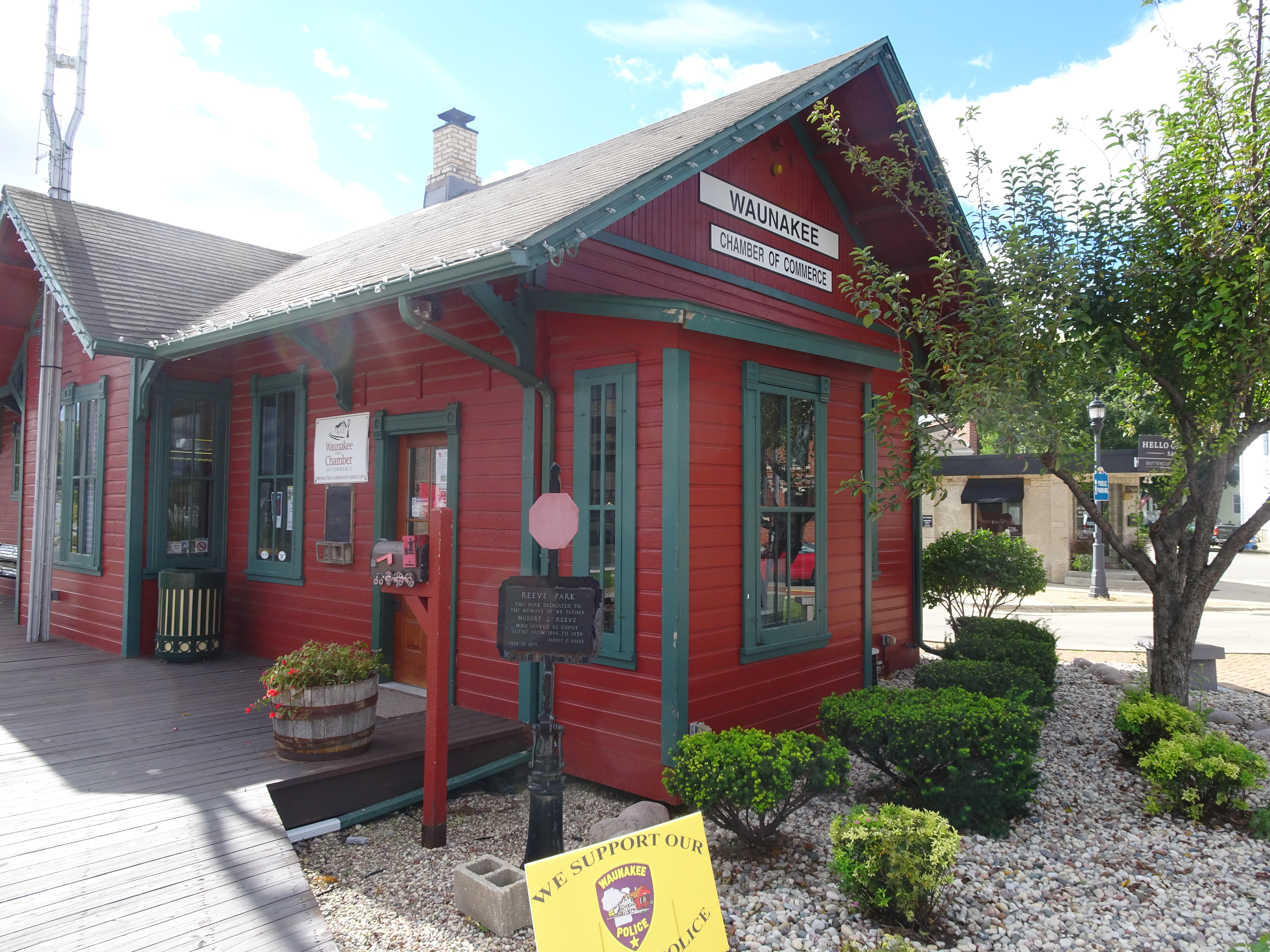
Waunakee station

Major highways:

- Interstate 39/90/94 (concurrently) – has an exit for Waunakee at Wisconsin Highway 19, east of the city
- U.S. Route 12 – runs four miles west of Waunakee, with a connection via WIS-19
- Wisconsin Highway 19 – heads west to Springfield Corners, U.S. 12, and Mazomanie; east to I-39/90/94 and Sun Prairie
- Wisconsin Highway 113 – heads north to Dane, Lodi, Merrimac Ferry, and Baraboo; south to Madison

The Waunakee Airport (FAA ID 6P3) is a privately owned general aviation airport 1-mile (1.6 km) south of the village center. A number of homes are along the runway, and many have hangars, allowing the airport to function as an airpark. Commercial air service is provided by Dane County Regional Airport.

A Wisconsin and Southern railroad line runs through town en route to Dane, Lodi, Baraboo, and Reedsburg. Waunakee station previously served passengers until 1963.

== Notable people ==
- Martha Bablitch, Judge of the Wisconsin Court of Appeals; lived in Waunakee
- John Bennett, 1956 Summer Olympics long jump silver medalist; lived in Waunakee
- Ernest J. Briskey, Vice President, Technical and Administration of Campbell Soup Company; Dean of Agricultural Science of Oregon State University; lived in Waunakee
- Ron Dayne, Heisman Trophy winner (1999), College Football Hall of Famer, NFL player; lived in Waunakee
- Bernice Fitz-Gibbon, advertising executive; born outside of Waunakee
- Edward E. Fitzgibbon, Wisconsin State Representative; born and lived outside of Waunakee
- Pat Ford, ice hockey player; lives in Waunakee
- Lawrence Johnson, NFL cornerback; lives in Waunakee
- Kenneth A. Koon, Army National Guard general; native of Waunakee
- Mike Moh, martial artist/actor; lives in Waunakee
- David D. O'Malley, Wisconsin State Representative; lived in Waunakee
- Cy Pieh, Major League Baseball player; born in Waunakee
- Robert Campbell Reeve, founder of Reeve Aleutian Airways; born in Waunakee
- Jack Salzwedel, chairman and CEO of American Family Insurance; lives in Waunakee
- Kelly Sheffield, Wisconsin Badgers women's volleyball coach; lives in Waunakee
- Georgia Thompson, civil servant; lived in Waunakee
- J.B. Van Hollen, former Attorney General of Wisconsin; lives in Waunakee
