= Waunakee station =

- Waunakee Railroad Depot
- U.S. National Register of Historic Places
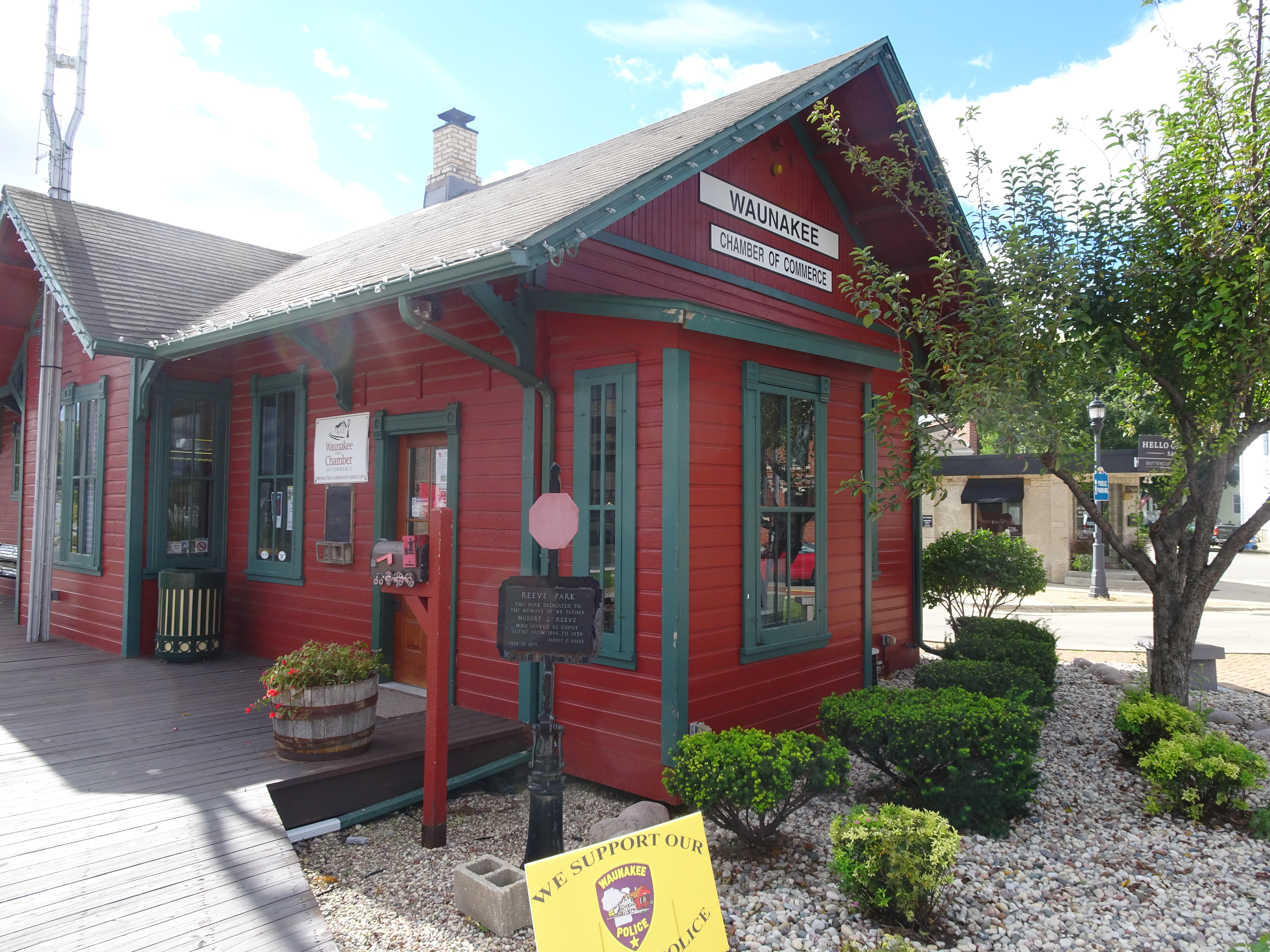
- Waunakee station

- Location within Wisconsin
- Location: South and Main Sts., Waunakee, Wisconsin
- Coordinates: 43°11′30″N 89°27′15″W
- Area: 0.4 acres (0.16 ha)
- Built: 1896
- Architectural style: Queen Anne
- NRHP reference No.: 78000092
- Added to NRHP: February 14, 1978

The Waunakee Railroad Depot is a small wooden depot of the Chicago and North Western Railway built in 1896 in Waunakee, Wisconsin. In 1978 it was listed on the National Register of Historic Places.

The railroad is what made Waunakee. Before its arrival, the only thing on the village's site was the blacksmith shop of S.P. Martin. In the late 1860s the Chicago and North Western Railway decided to build a line connecting Madison to St. Paul. As the C&NW planned its route, George Fish and Louis Bacon, who owned land around what would become Waunakee, offered a strip of land for the right of way and $1500 in bonds. The railroad accepted their offer and Fish and Bacon profited when the little depot became a shipping point for the surrounding farmlands. A village grew around it, with stores, schools and churches.

In 1896 (or 1892?) the original depot burned and the C&NW built the current depot in 1896. It is a one-story wooden building clad in drop-siding, with wide overhanging eaves supported by brackets, with carved bargeboards in some of the gable peaks.

At the peak of rail shipping, sixty trains ran through Waunakee per day, with 14 of them carrying passengers. Passenger service ran until 1963 - freight until 1971.

In the 1970s the depot was restored by the Waunakee Arts Council and others, and it was bought from the C&NW with a gift form Bob Reeve, a son of an early depot agent Hubert. Today the depot houses Waunakee's Chamber of Commerce.

Preceding station	Chicago and North Western Railway	Following station
Dane toward Minneapolis	Chicago – Minneapolis via Madison	Mendota toward Chicago
