= Westport, Wisconsin =

- Town
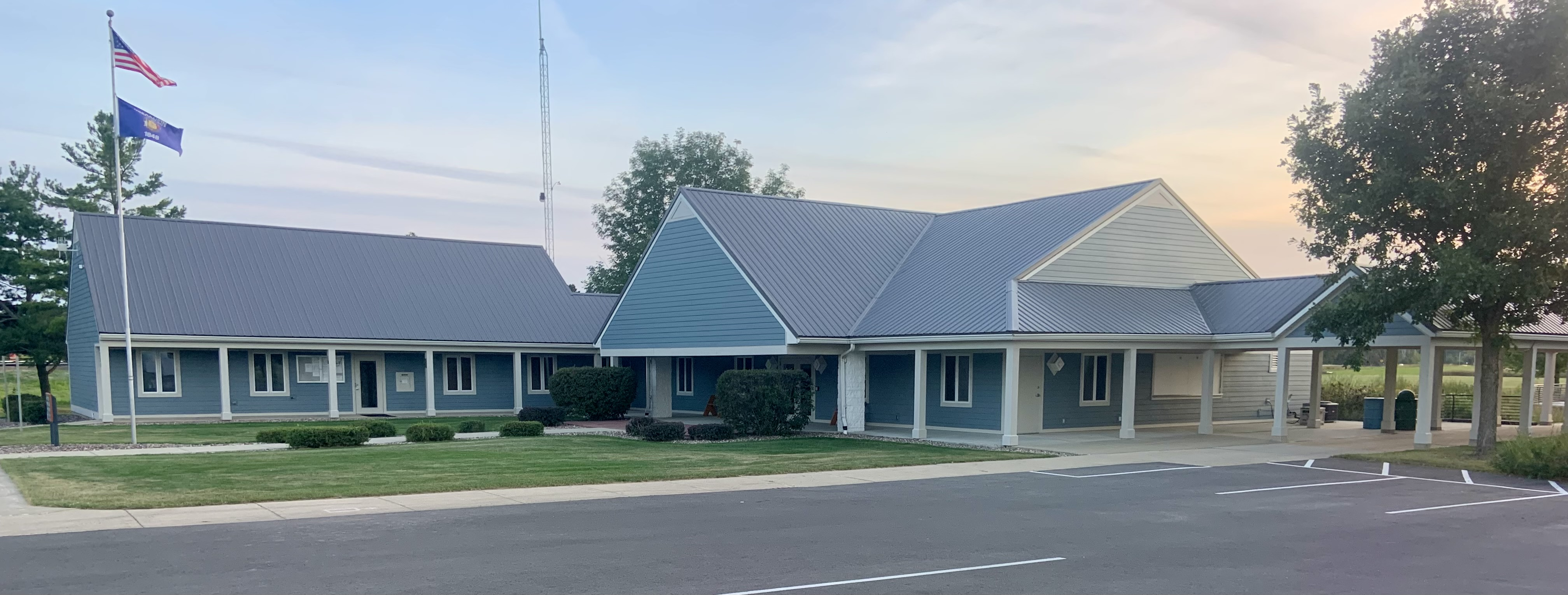
- Town hall

- Location in Dane County, Wisconsin
- Coordinates: 43°9′33″N 89°25′33″W
- Country: United States
- State: Wisconsin
- County: Dane

Government
  - Town Board Chair: John Cuccia

Area
  - Total: 27.2 sq mi (70.5 km^{2})
  - Land: 22.2 sq mi (57.6 km^{2})
  - Water: 5.0 sq mi (13.0 km^{2})
- Elevation: 876 ft (267 m)

Population (2020)
  - Total: 4,183
  - Density: 161/sq mi (62.3/km^{2})
- Time zone: UTC-6 (Central (CST))
  - Summer (DST): UTC-5 (CDT)
- Area codes: 608, 353
- FIPS code: 55-86125
- GNIS feature ID: 1584415

Westport is a town in Dane County, Wisconsin, United States. Its population was 4,183 at the 2020 census. It is a suburb of Madison.

== History ==
The town was named after Westport, County Mayo, in Ireland because many of the early settlers were from there. The village of Waunakee was carved out of the town in 1893, leaving the remainder of the town on both sides. Other portions have been annexed by the cities of Madison and Middleton. A portion of the former Town of Madison on the northern shore of Lake Mendota was transferred to Westport.

In September 2024, the town's board of supervisors voted to support a petition to incorporate as a village, and it filed a petition with Wisconsin's Incorporation Review Board in July 2025.

== Geography ==
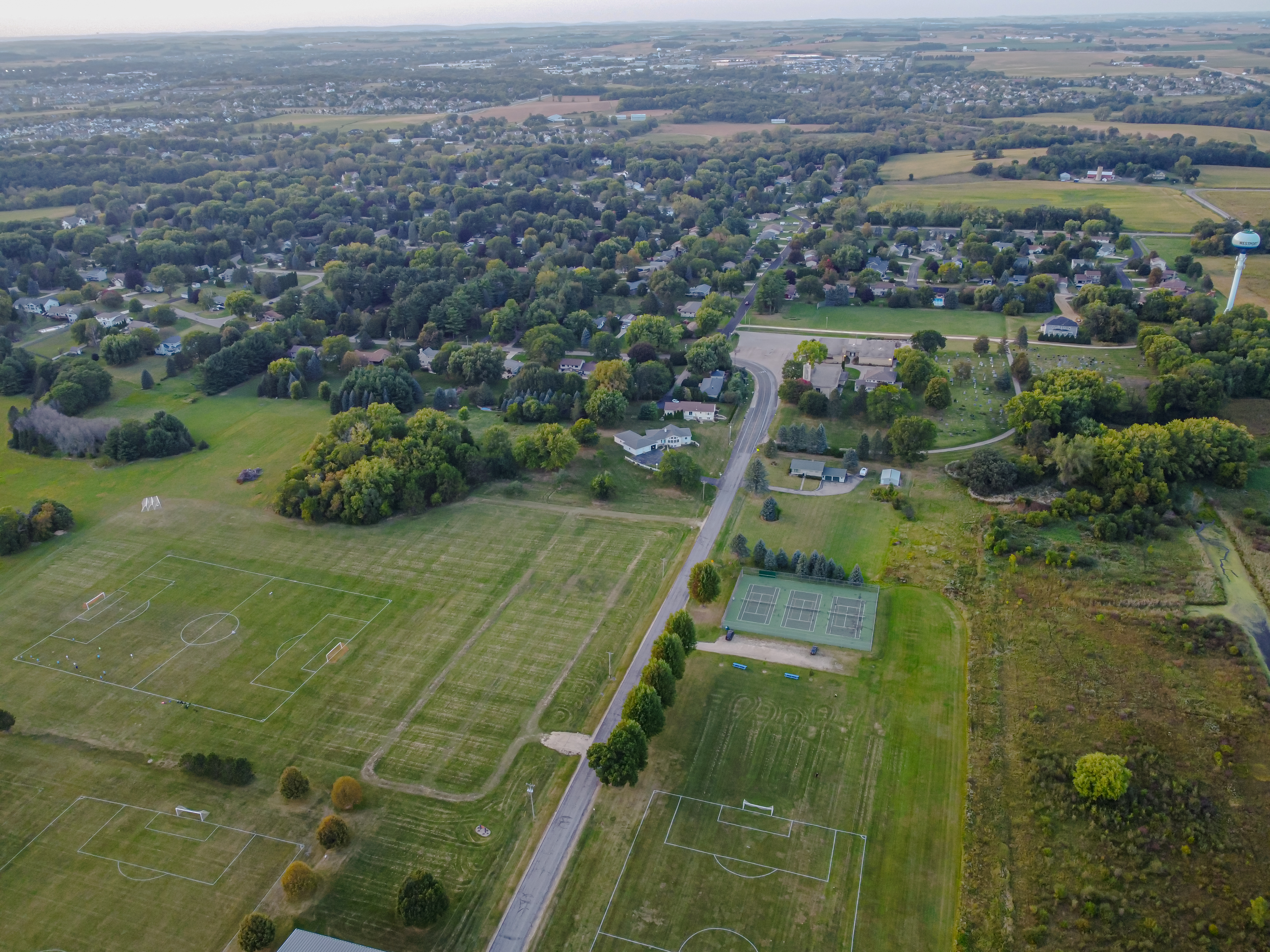
Aerial view of Westport

According to the United States Census Bureau, the town has a total area of 27.2 square miles (70.6 km^{2}), of which 5.0 square miles (13.0 km^{2}) (18.39%) are covered by water.

Governor Nelson State Park is located in the town.

== Demographics ==
At the 2000 United States census, 3,586 people, 1,546 households, and 1,049 families lived in the town. The population density was 161.3 people per square mile (62.3/km^{2}). The 1,752 housing units had an average density of 78.8 per square mile (30.4/km^{2}). The racial makeup of the town was 97.69% White, 0.61% African American, 0.17% Native American, 0.86% Asian, 0.08% Pacific Islander, 0.25% from other races, and 0.33% from two or more races. Hispanics or Latinos of any race were 0.78%.

Of the 1,546 households, 25.3% had children under 18 living with them, 62.4% were married couples living together, 3.5% had a female householder with no husband present, and 32.1% were not families. About 25.5% of households were one person and 7.6% were one person 65 or older. The average household size was 2.32 and the average family size was 2.80.

The age distribution was 20.8% under 18, 4.7% from 18 to 24, 27.3% from 25 to 44, 32.2% from 45 to 64, and 15.0% were 65 or older. The median age was 43 years. For every 100 females, there were 104.3 males. For every 100 females 18 and over, there were 101.8 males.

The median income for a household was $64,750 and for a family was $75,357. Males had a median income of $51,671 versus $34,671 for females. The per capita income for the town was $40,268. About 0.7% of families and 3.0% of the population were below the poverty line, including none under 18 and 3.5% of those 65 or over.

== Notable people ==
- Edward E. Fitzgibbon, a Wisconsin state representative, farmer, and teacher, lived in the town; Fitzgibbon served as Westport town clerk.
- John H. Tierney, Wisconsin state representative and farmer, lived in the town; Tierney served as chairman of the Westport town board.
