= 2001 CHA men's ice hockey tournament =

2001 CHA Men's ice hockey tournament
- Dates: March 8–10, 2000
- Teams: 5
- Finals site: Von Braun Center; Huntsville, Alabama
- Champions: Wayne State (1st title)
- Winning coach: Bill Wilkinson (1st title)
- MVP: David Guerrera (Wayne State)
- CHA Men's Ice Hockey Tournaments

The 2001 CHA Men's Ice Hockey Tournament (also known as the 2001 CHA Final Five) was the 2nd tournament in conference history and was played between March 8 and March 10, 2001, at the Von Braun Center in Huntsville, Alabama. Wayne State defeated Alabama-Huntsville 4–1 in the championship game to win the tournament.

== Format ==
The tournament featured three rounds of play. The top five teams in the regular season conference standings advanced to the tournament. In the first round, the fourth and fifth ranked seeds, Air Force and Findlay, played for entry into the semifinals, to which the top three seeds received byes. The winners of the two semifinal games then played for the championship on March 10, 2001.

=== Conference standings ===
Note: GP = Games played; W = Wins; L = Losses; T = Ties; PTS = Points; GF = Goals For; GA = Goals Against

2000–01 College Hockey America standings
	Conference							Overall					
	GP	W	L	T	PTS	GF	GA	GP	W	L	T	GF	GA
Alabama–Huntsville†	20	15	4	1	31	78	49	34	21	12	1	115	87
Niagara	20	10	7	3	23	59	52	38	14	19	5	97	105
Wayne State*	20	8	9	3	19	59	68	35	18	14	3	114	104
Air Force	19	6	9	4	18	51	61	37	16	17	4	114	109
Findlay	20	8	10	2	18	57	63	27	10	15	2	66	92
Bemidji State	19	4	12	3	11	51	62	34	4	26	4	77	133
Championship: Wayne State † indicates conference regular season champion * indicates conference tournament champion Final rankings: USA Today/USA Hockey Magazine Top 15 Poll

== Bracket ==
Quarterfinal

March 8, 2000

Semifinals

March 9, 2000

Championship

March 10, 2000

1
Alabama-Huntsville
7

4
Air Force
0

4
Air Force
2

5
Findlay
1

1
Alabama-Huntsville
1

3
Wayne State
4

2
Niagara
2

Third place

3
Wayne State
3*

2
Niagara
2

4
Air Force
1

Note: * denotes overtime period(s)

== Tournament awards ==
=== All-Star team ===
- Goaltender: David Guerrera (Wayne State)
- Defensemen: Darren Curry (Alabama-Huntsville), Tyler Kindle (Wayne State)
- Forwards: Jason Durbin (Wayne State), Dustin Kingston (Wayne State), Ryan McCormack (Alabama-Huntsville), Maxim Starchenko (Wayne State)

=== MVP ===
- David Guerrera (Wayne State)
