= Kenneth A. Koon =

Kenneth A. Koon is a brigadier general in the Wisconsin Army National Guard.

== Biography ==
Koon is a native of Waunakee, Wisconsin. He graduated from the University of Wisconsin-Oshkosh and Silver Lake College.

== Career ==
Koon originally enlisted in the United States Army in 1977. He was stationed at Fort Sill as a member of the Military Police Corps. Later, he transferred to the United States Army Reserve and was assigned to the 84th Division. In 1982, Koon received his commission through the Reserve Officers' Training Corps.

After transferring to the Wisconsin Army National Guard, Koon was assigned to the 127th Infantry Regiment. During the Iraq War, he commanded Forward Operating Base Grizzly and Camp Ashraf. Later, he was assigned to Fort McCoy, Wisconsin.

In addition to his civilian education, Koon is a graduate of the United States Army War College, the United States Army Airborne School, the United States Army Command and General Staff College and the Joint Forces Staff College.

Awards he has received include the Bronze Star Medal, the Meritorious Service Medal, the Army Commendation Medal, the Army Achievement Medal, the Army Reserve Components Achievement Medal, the National Defense Service Medal, the Iraq Campaign Medal, the Humanitarian Service Medal, the Armed Forces Reserve Medal and the Overseas Service Ribbon. In addition, Koon is a member of the Order of Saint Barbara.
