= Edward E. Fitzgibbon =

American politician

Edward Edwin Fitzgibbon (June 6, 1844 – June 30, 1909) (Note: Fitzgibbon's year of birth was 1844 according to the 1850 and 1860 censuses and his death notice. However, the 1880 and 1900 censuses show his birth year as 1847.) was a farmer, teacher, and politician.

Born in Staten Island, New York, Fitzgibbon moved to Wisconsin and settled in the town of Westport, Dane County, Wisconsin. Fitzgibbon was a teacher and farmer. Fitzgibbon served as superintendent of schools and as Westport Town Clerk. In 1885, Fitzgibbon served in the Wisconsin State Assembly and was a Democrat. He lived in Waunakee, Wisconsin. Fitzgibbon lived in Arizona for three years and then returned to Dane County, Wisconsin, where he died of a heart ailment.
