= 2003 CHA men's ice hockey tournament =

2003 CHA Men's ice hockey tournament
- Dates: March 14–16, 2003
- Teams: 6
- Finals site: Tri-City Arena; Kearney, Nebraska
- Champions: Wayne State (3rd title)
- Winning coach: Bill Wilkinson (3rd title)
- MVP: Marc St. Jean (Wayne State)
- CHA Men's Ice Hockey Tournaments

The 2003 CHA Men's Ice Hockey Tournament was the 4th tournament in conference history and was played between March 14 and March 16, 2003 at Tri-City Arena in Kearney, Nebraska. By winning the tournament, Wayne State received College Hockey America's automatic bid to the 2003 NCAA Division I Men's Ice Hockey Tournament.

== Format ==
The tournament featured six teams. The top two teams from the regular season received byes to the semifinals where they played the winners from the quarterfinal games. The two semifinal winners met in the championship game on March 16, 2003, with the winner receiving an automatic bid to the 2003 NCAA Division I Men's Ice Hockey Tournament.

=== Conference standings ===
Note: GP = Games played; W = Wins; L = Losses; T = Ties; PTS = Points; GF = Goals For; GA = Goals Against

2002–03 College Hockey America standings
	Conference							Overall					
	GP	W	L	T	PTS	GF	GA	GP	W	L	T	GF	GA
Alabama–Huntsville†	20	13	5	2	28	88	59	35	18	14	3	135	121
Niagara	20	11	4	5	27	77	60	37	15	17	5	126	133
Wayne State*	20	11	7	2	24	62	56	40	21	17	2	131	131
Bemidji State	20	10	6	4	24	58	46	36	14	14	8	95	98
Findlay	20	3	13	4	10	41	77	35	10	21	4	93	120
Air Force	20	2	15	3	7	45	73	37	10	24	3	98	146
Championship: Wayne State † indicates conference regular season champion * indicates conference tournament champion Final rankings: USA Today/USA Hockey Magazine Top 15 Poll

== Bracket ==
Quarterfinal

March 14, 2003

Semifinals

March 15, 2003

Championship

March 16, 2003

1
Alabama-Huntsville
1

4
Bemidji State
4

4
Bemidji State
2*

5
Findlay
0

3
Wayne State
3

4
Bemidji State
2

2
Niagara
4

3
Wayne State
4

3
Wayne State
6

6
Air Force
2

Note: * denotes overtime period(s)

== Tournament awards ==
=== All-Star team ===
- Goaltender: David Guerrera (Wayne State)
- Defensemen: Bryce Methven (Bemidji State), Marc St. Jean (Wayne State)
- Forwards: Jason Durbin (Wayne State), Dustin Kingston (Wayne State), Barret Ehgoetz (Niagara), Andrew Murray (Bemidji State)

=== MVP ===
- Marc St. Jean (Wayne State)
