= Findlay Oilers =

College sport team in Ohio

- University: University of Findlay
- Nickname: Oilers; Roughnecks (wrestling only)
- NCAA: Division II
- Conference: GMAC (2017–)
- Athletic director: Jim Givens
- Location: Findlay, Ohio
- Varsity teams: 20 (10 men's, 10 women's)
- Football stadium: Donnell Stadium
- Basketball arena: Croy Gymnasium
- Baseball stadium: Fifth Third Field
- Softball stadium: Anderson Field
- Soccer stadium: DeHaven Field
- Aquatics center: Sink Natatorium
- Lacrosse stadium: Armstrong Sports Complex
- Volleyball arena: Croy Gymnasium
- Other venues: Robert A. Malcolm Athletic Center
- Colors: Black and orange
- Mascot: Derrick the Oiler
- Website: findlayoilers.com
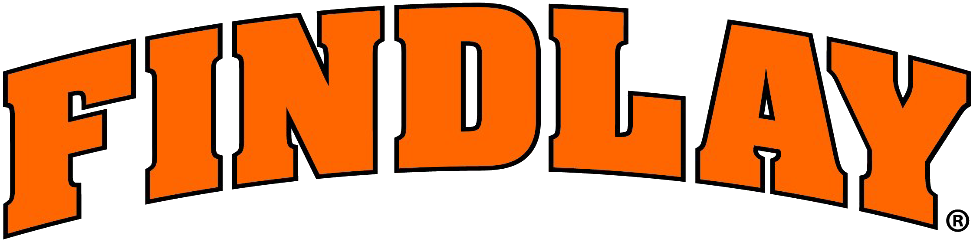

The Findlay Oilers are the athletic teams that represent the University of Findlay, located in Findlay, Ohio, in NCAA Division II intercollegiate sporting competitions. The Oilers currently compete as members of the Great Midwest Athletic Conference. The Oilers were a member of the GLIAC since 1997, when they switched from the NAIA to the NCAA. Findlay sponsors 20 NCAA-sanctioned intercollegiate sports. Findlay formerly sponsored varsity men's ice hockey, with the 1999–2004 seasons at the NCAA Division I level.

== Varsity teams ==
Men's sports	Women's sports
Baseball	Basketball
Basketball	Cross country
Cross country	Golf
Football	Lacrosse
Golf	Soccer
Soccer	Softball
Swimming	Swimming
Tennis	Tennis
Track and field	Track and field
Wrestling	Volleyball

== Former teams ==
=== Ice hockey ===
The Oilers joined the Division I ranks in 1999 as a founding member of the College Hockey America (CHA) conference, along with six other schools, after only three years in existence as a Division II program. Findlay spent five years in the CHA, never finishing higher than fourth in the standings, and only winning a single game in the conference tournament. The program was disestablished in 2004.

== National championships ==
- 1979: Football – NAIA Division II
- 1992: Football – NAIA Division II
- 1995: Football – NAIA Division II
- 1995: Wrestling – NAIA
- 1997: Football – NAIA
- 2001: Equestrian team (English) – IHSA
- 2001: Equestrian team (Western) – IHSA
- 2005: Equestrian team (Western) – IHSA
- 2007: Equestrian team (Western) – IHSA
- 2009: Equestrian team (Western) – IHSA
- 2009: Men's Basketball – NCAA Division II National Championship Record 36–0
- 2022: Women's Golf – NCAA Division II National Championship

== Facilities ==
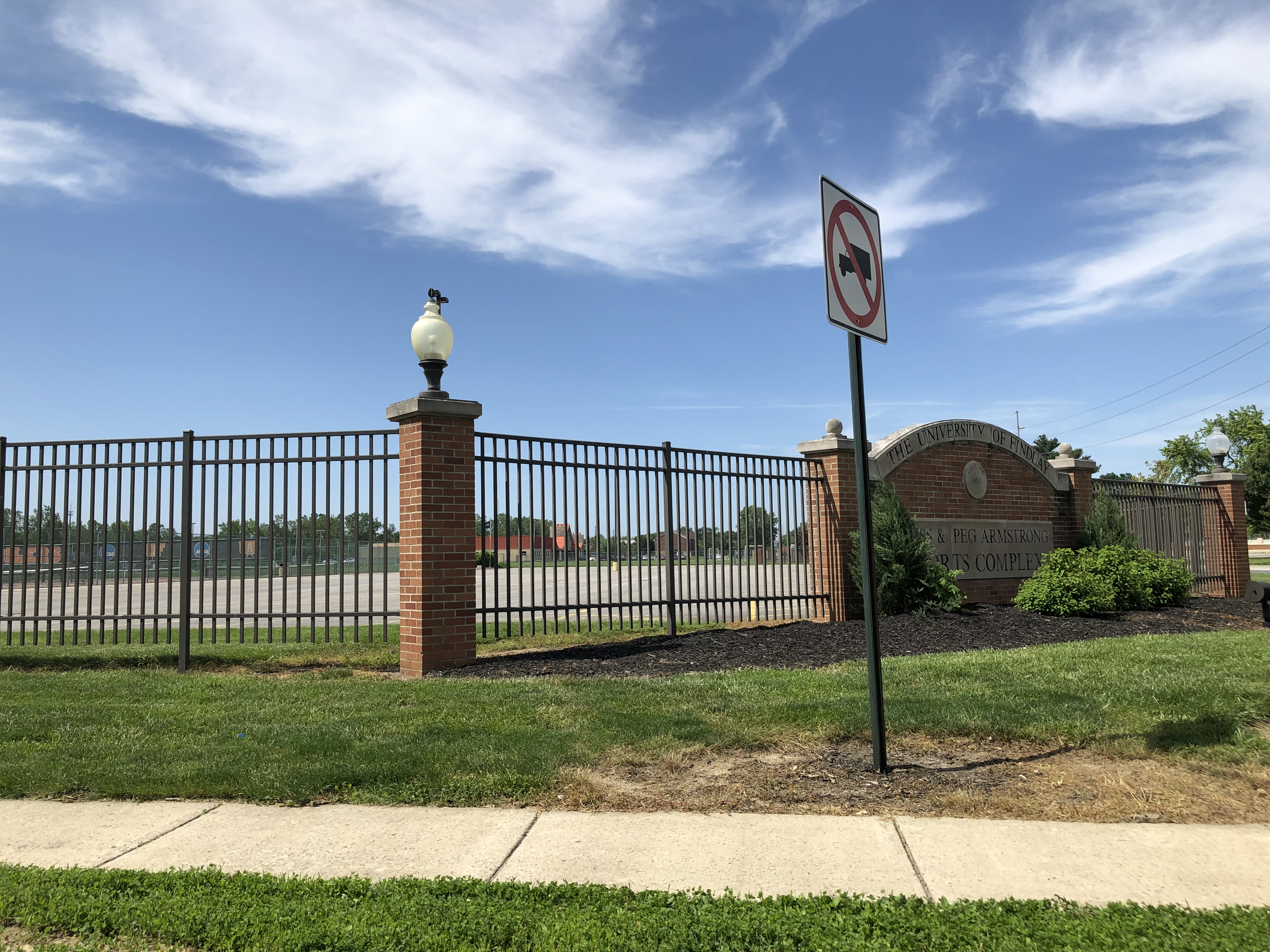
Russ and Peg Armstrong Sports Complex

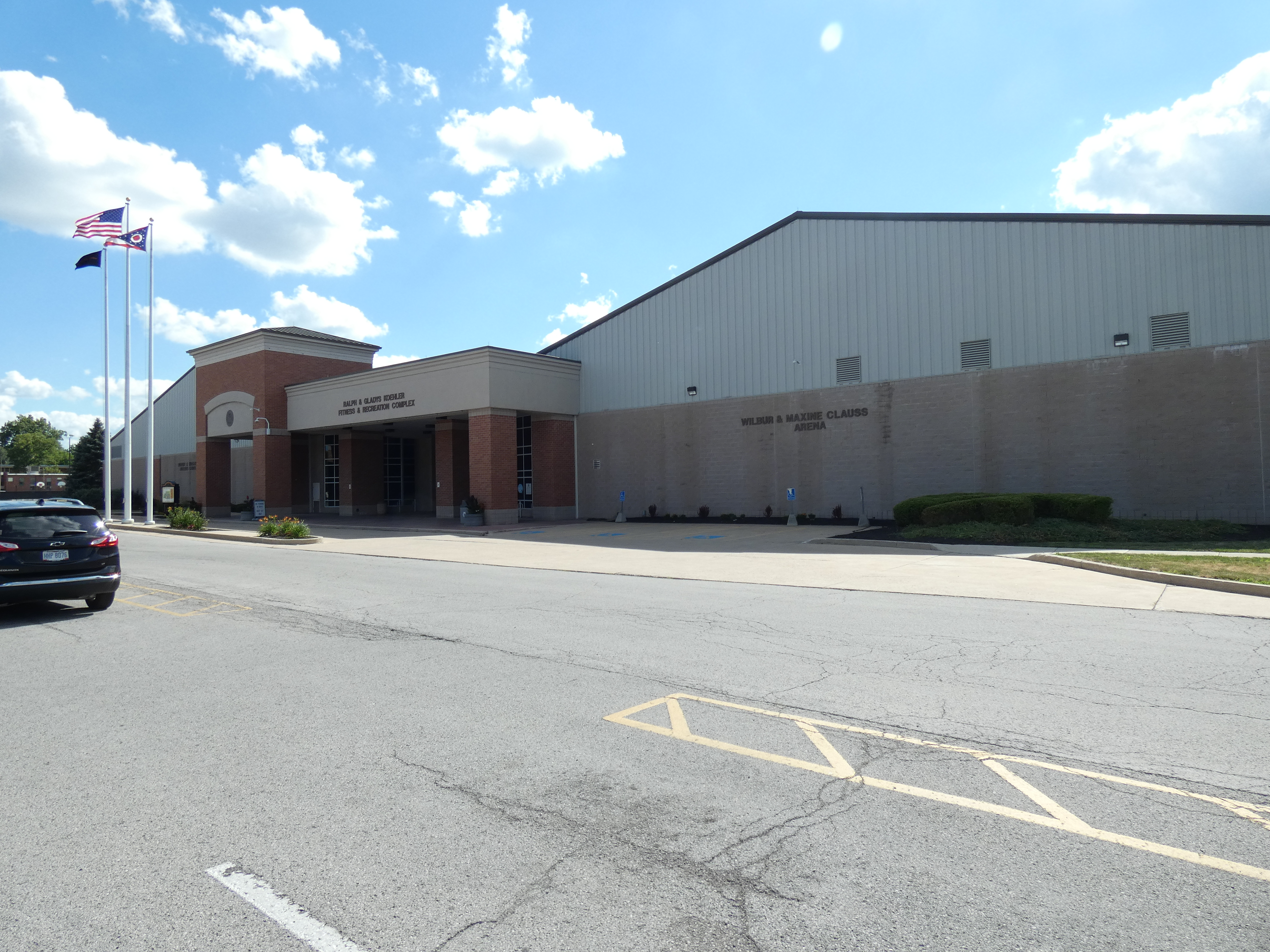
Koehler Fitness & Recreation Complex

Venue	Sport(s)	Open.	Ref.
Donnell Stadium	Football	1928	
Niekamp Arena	Basketball; Volleyball	1970	
DeHaven Soccer Complex	Soccer	n/a	
Armstrong Sports Complex	Lacrosse; Tennis	n/a	
Beall Oilers Center	Golf	2022	
Sink Natatorium	Swimming	n/a	
Dick Strahm Champions Field	(various) (Note: Facility for training or recreational purposes.)	n/a	
Koehler Fitness and Recreation Complex	(various)	n/a	
Fifth Third Field	Baseball; Softball	n/a	
Anderson Field	Baseball; Softball	n/a	

=== Former facilities ===
Venue	Sport(s)	Opened	Closed	Ref.
Clauss Ice Arena	Ice hockey	1999	2010	
