= Kārlis Zirnis =

Latvian ice hockey coach

- Born: 2 November 1977 (age 49) Riga, Latvian SSR, USSR
- Height: 5 ft 11 in (180 cm)
- Weight: 185 lb (84 kg; 13 st 3 lb)
- Position: Left wing
- Shot: Left
- Played for: Alabama–Huntsville; Colorado Eagles; Bossier-Shreveport Mudbugs; Huntsville Havoc
- National team: Latvia
- Playing career: 1996–2010 Coaching career

Current position
- Title: Assistant coach
- Team: Mercyhurst
- Conference: Atlantic Hockey America

Coaching career (HC unless noted)
- 2010–2012: Amarillo Bulls (scout)
- 2011–2012: TPH Thunder U16 (asst.)
- 2012–2017: Latvian National Team (asst.)
- 2014–2015: Latvian Junior Team (asst.)
- 2014–2016: Nashville Junior Predators
- 2016–2017: Latvian Junior Team (asst.)
- 2016–2018: Shreveport Mudbugs
- 2017–present: Latvian Junior Team
- 2018–2020: Alaska (asst.)
- 2020–2021: Alabama–Huntsville (asst.)
- 2021–2023: Amarillo Wranglers (asst.)
- 2023–2025: Rensselaer (asst.)
- 2025–Present: Mercyhurst (asst.)

Kārlis Zirnis (born 2 November 1977) is a Latvian former professional ice hockey player and coach. As of 2021, he is the director of player personnel for the Amarillo Wranglers in the North American Hockey League (NAHL).

== Playing career ==
Zirnis played junior hockey in Latvia before moving to the United States, where he played for the Gaylord Grizzlies in the North American Hockey League (NAHL) in the 1997–98 season. From 1999 to 2003, he played college hockey for the Alabama–Huntsville Chargers. Zirnis led the team in scoring during his sophomore and junior seasons in Huntsville. After graduating, he played five seasons in the Central Hockey League (CHL) with the Amarillo Gorillas, Colorado Eagles, and the Bossier-Shreveport Mudbugs. Zirnis finished his playing career with the Huntsville Havoc of the Southern Professional Hockey League, where he was the team's captain in the 2008–09 season, and retired after one game of the 2009–10 season.

== Coaching career ==
After retiring from playing, Zirnis was a scout for the NAHL's Amarillo Bulls and an assistant coach for the TPH Thunder midget hockey organization. He was named Ted Nolan's assistant for the Latvian national team before the 2013 IIHF World Championship, and also coached in the 2014 and 2015 World Championships and the 2014 Olympics.

From 2013 to 2016, Zirnis was the head coach of the Nashville Junior Predators of the North American 3 Hockey League (NA3HL). In 2016, Zirnis was named the first head coach of the Shreveport Mudbugs in the North American Hockey League, an expansion team using the name of his former CHL team. In the 2017–18 NAHL season, Zirnis led the Mudbugs to the Robertson Cup championship.

Following his championship season in Shreveport, he joined the University of Alaska-Fairbanks hockey team as an assistant coach. Zirnis spent two seasons in Fairbanks before returning to his alma mater, the Alabama–Huntsville Chargers, as an associate coach for the 2020–21 season.

In 2021, he returned to the NAHL as the director of player personnel with the Amarillo Wranglers.
