= Clauss Ice Arena =

Indoor ice hockey venue in Findlay, Ohio

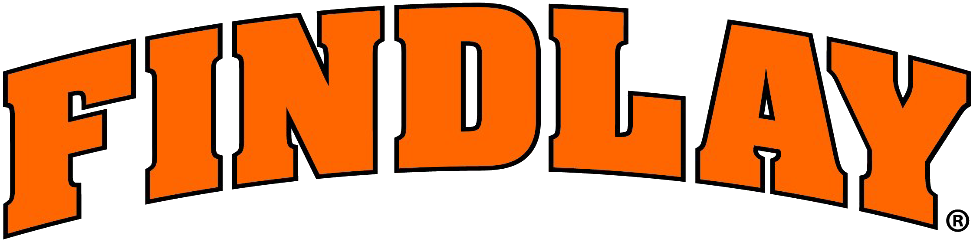

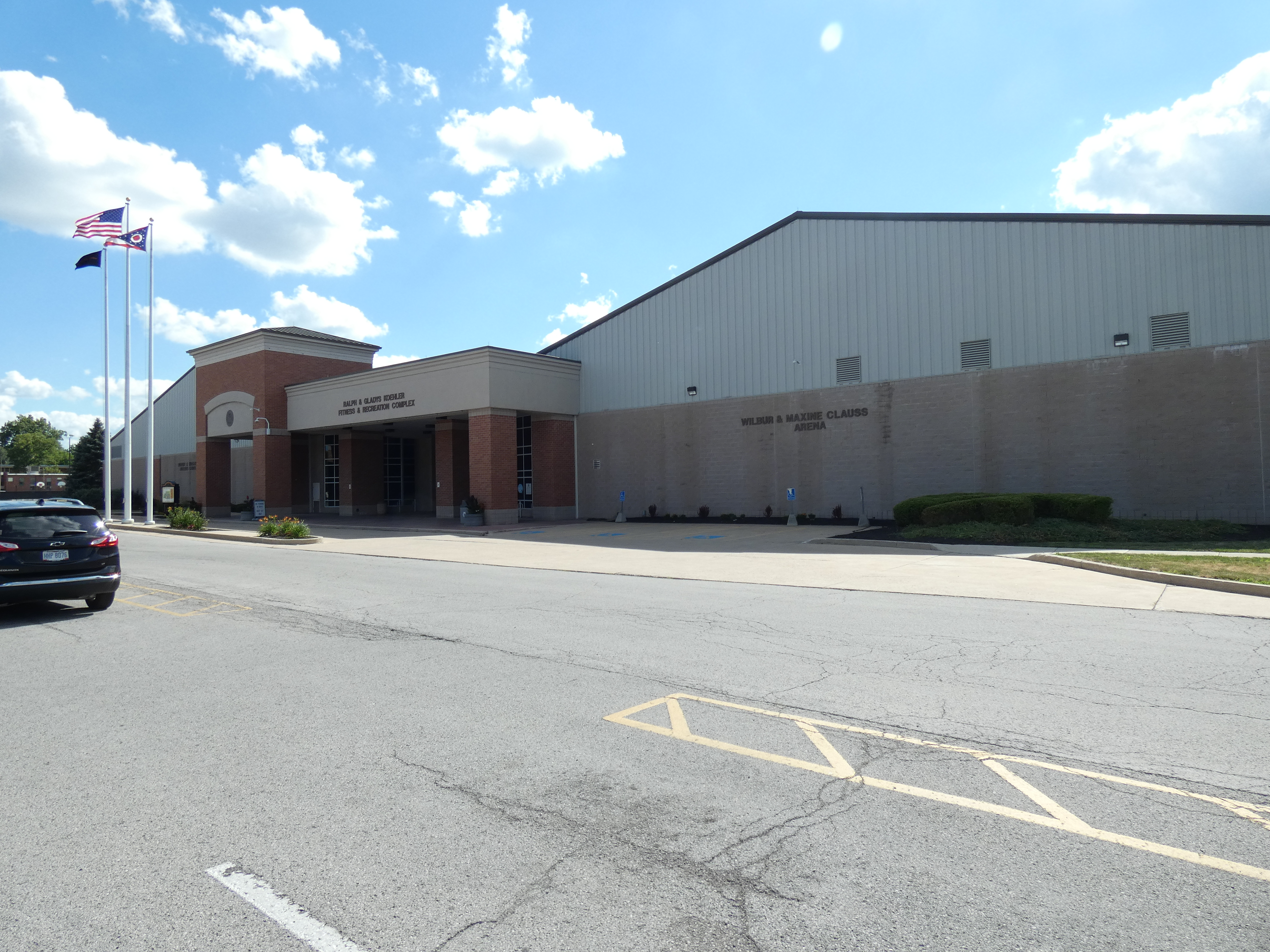
- The former arena as seen in 2022
- Interactive map of Clauss Ice Arena
- Address: Findlay, OH; United States
- Coordinates: 41°03′24″N 83°39′07″W
- Owner: University of Findlay
- Operator: Univ. of Findlay Athletics
- Type: Ice rink
- Current use: Ice hockey (1999–2010)

Construction
- Opened: 1999
- Closed: 2010; 16 years ago

Tenants
- Findlay Oilers (NCAA) teams: ice hockey (1999–2004); Findlay Freedom (NEHL, 2006–2008)

The Wilbur and Maxine Clauss Ice Arena was an indoor ice hockey arena on the campus of the University of Findlay in Findlay, Ohio. It was built in 1999 as part of the Ralph and Gladys Koehler Fitness and Recreation Complex to house the Findlay Oilers varsity team.

In 2010, it was converted into a general student recreation center.
