= Findlay Oilers men's ice hockey =

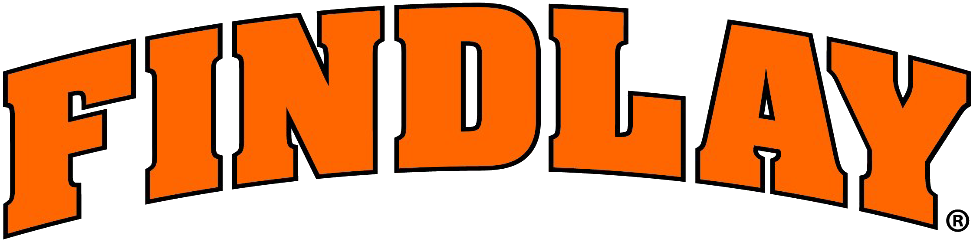
- University: University of Findlay
- Conference: CHA
- Head coach: N/A
- Arena: Clauss Ice Arena; Findlay, Ohio
- Colors: Black and orange

Conference tournament champions
- MCHA: 1999

Conference regular season champions
- MCHA: 1999

The Findlay Oilers men's ice hockey is a defunct NCAA's Division I ice hockey team. The Oilers joined the Division I ranks in 1999 as a founding member of the College Hockey America (CHA) conference, along with six other schools, after only three years in existence as a Division II program. Findlay spent five years in the CHA, never finishing higher than fourth in the standings, and only winning a single game in the conference tournament.

After a change to the administration of Findlay in the summer of 2003, the University announced on January 6, 2004 that the ice hockey program would revert to club and intramural status. The change did not come as a shock to many familiar with Findlay's situation as head coach Craig Barnett had already resigned to take a position with Lake Forest Academy prep school. The MAAC refused to allow any of its teams to play the Oilers for the 2000-01 season because of conference by-laws prohibiting member teams from playing provisional Division I schools. When the CHA applied for its automatic tournament bid in 2002, the NCAA had reservations about Findlay's full Division I status as it had moved the University's athletic program to Division II status only four years earlier. Because NCAA rules mandate that automatic bid conferences must contain at least six member schools the CHA scrambled to resolve the waiver that would allow Findlay to play in the conference despite the 9-year moratorium mandated by the NCAA on teams playing above their level. The CHA was able to receive the bid for the 2003 season after a waiver was granted retroactively.

== Season-by-season records ==
Season	Division	Conference	Record	Pct.	Position	Conference Tournament	Coach
1996–97	Division II	Independent	15–11–3	.569	—	—	Craig Barnett
1997–98	Division II	Independent	11–16–1	.411	—	—	Craig Barnett
1998–99	Division II	MCHA	23–5–0	.821	1st	MCHA Champion	Craig Barnett
1999–2000	Division I	CHA	11–20–0	.358	5th	Quarterfinal loss	Craig Barnett
2000–01	Division I	CHA	10–15–2	.407	4th	Quarterfinal loss	Craig Barnett
2001–02	Division I	CHA	11–22–2	.343	6th	Quarterfinal loss	Craig Barnett
2002–03	Division I	CHA	10–21–4	.343	5th	Quarterfinal loss	Craig Barnett
2003–04	Division I	CHA	11–22–5	.355	4th	Semifinal loss	Pat Ford
8 seasons	—	—	102–132–17	.440	—	1 championship (D-II)	2 coaches

== All-time coaching records ==
=== Division I ===
Tenure	Coach	Years	Record	Pct.
2003–2004	Pat Ford	1	11–22–5	.355
1999–2003	Craig Barnett	4	42–78–8	.359
Totals	2 coaches	5 seasons	53–100–13	.358

=== Division II ===
Tenure	Coach	Years	Record	Pct.
1996–1999	Craig Barnett	3	49–32–4	.600
Totals	1 coach	3 seasons	49–32–4	.600
