= List of Niagara Purple Eagles men's ice hockey seasons =

This is a season-by-season list of records compiled by Niagara in men's ice hockey.

Niagara University has made four appearances in the NCAA Tournament, despite being one of the newest programs at the Division I level.

== Season-by-season results ==
Note: GP = Games played, W = Wins, L = Losses, T = Ties

NCAA D-I Champions	NCAA Frozen Four	Conference regular season champions	Conference Playoff Champions

Season	Conference	Regular Season (Note: Code explanation; GP—Games Played, W—Wins, L—Losses, T—Tied games, OTW—Overtime Wins, OTL—Overtime Loses, 3/SW—Win in 3 on 3 overtime or shootout, Pts—Points*)														Conference Tournament Results	National Tournament Results
Season	Conference	Conference									Overall					Conference Tournament Results	National Tournament Results
Season	Conference	GP	W	L	T	OTW	OTL	3/SW	Pts*	Finish	GP	W	L	T	%	Conference Tournament Results	National Tournament Results
Division III
Blaise MacDonald (1996–2001)
1996–97	ECAC West	10	6	2	2	–	–	–	14	2nd	27	16	9	2	.630		
1997–98	ECAC West	10	8	1	1	–	–	–	17	1st	27	14	10	3	.574	Won Semifinal, 4–1 (Canisius); Won Championship, 5–2 (RIT)	
Division I
1998–99	Independent	–	–	–	–	–	–	–	–	–	32	17	12	3	.578		
1999–00	CHA	17	15	0	2	–	–	–	32	1st	42	30	8	4	.762	Won Semifinal, 9–1 (Air Force); Won Championship, 3–2 (Alabama–Huntsville)	Won Regional Quarterfinal, 4–1 (New Hampshire); Lost regional semifinal, 1–4 (North Dakota)
2000–01	CHA	20	10	7	3	–	–	–	23	2nd	38	14	19	5	.434	Lost Semifinal, 2–3 (OT) (Wayne State); Tied Third-place game, 2–2 (OT) (Air Force)	
Dave Burkholder (2001–2017)
2001–02	CHA	19	8	10	1	–	–	–	14	4th	35	17	17	1	.500	Lost Quarterfinal, 3–5 (Air Force)	
2002–03	CHA	20	11	4	5	–	–	–	27	2nd	37	15	17	5	.473	Lost Semifinal, 4–6 (Wayne State)	
2003–04	CHA	20	14	6	0	–	–	–	28	2nd	39	21	15	3	.577	Won Semifinal, 6–2 (Findlay); Won Championship, 4–3 (OT) (Bemidji State)	Lost Regional semifinal, 2–5 (Boston College)
2004–05	CHA	20	9	9	2	–	–	–	20	3rd	36	15	19	2	.444	Won Quarterfinal, 5–1 (Robert Morris); Lost Semifinal, 2–4 (Alabama–Huntsville)	
2005–06	CHA	20	13	6	1	–	–	–	27	1st	36	20	15	1	.569	Won Semifinal, 3–2 (Robert Morris); Lost Championship, 2–4 (Bemidji State)	
2006–07	CHA	20	9	5	6	–	–	–	24	1st	37	18	13	6	.568	Lost Quarterfinal, 3–5 (Alabama–Huntsville)	
2007–08	CHA	20	12	6	2	–	–	–	26	2nd	37	22	11	4	.649	Won Semifinal, 6–3 (Robert Morris); Won Championship, 3–2 (Bemidji State)	Lost Regional semifinal, 1–5 (Michigan)
2008–09	CHA	18	9	5	4	–	–	–	22	2nd	36	16	14	6	.528	Lost Semifinal, 1–2 (Robert Morris); Tied Third-place game, 1–1 (OT) (Alabama–Huntsville)	
2009–10	CHA	18	6	10	2	–	–	–	14	T–3rd	36	12	20	4	.389	Won Semifinal, 5–4 (Bemidji State); Lost Championship, 2–3 (OT) (Alabama–Huntsville)	
2010–11	Atlantic Hockey	27	15	10	2	–	–	–	32	4th	35	18	13	4	.571	Lost First round, 3–6 (Canisius)	
2011–12	Atlantic Hockey	27	14	6	7	–	–	–	35	2nd	37	17	11	9	.581	Won Quarterfinal series, 2–0 (Robert Morris); Lost Semifinal, 1–2 (OT) (RIT)	
2012–13	Atlantic Hockey	27	20	5	2	–	–	–	42	1st	38	23	10	5	.671	Won Quarterfinal series, 2–0 (RIT); Lost Semifinal, 3–5 (Canisius)	Lost Regional semifinal, 1–2 (North Dakota)
2013–14	Atlantic Hockey	27	11	11	5	–	–	–	27	6th	40	15	20	5	.438	Won First round series, 2–0 (American International); Won Quarterfinal series, 2–1 (Air Force); Lost Semifinal, 4–5 (OT) (Robert Morris)	
2014–15	Atlantic Hockey	28	5	19	4	–	–	–	14	11th	39	7	28	4	.231	Won First round series, 2–1 (Holy Cross); Lost Quarterfinal series, 0–2 (Robert Morris)	
2015–16	Atlantic Hockey	28	5	18	5	–	–	–	15	T–10th	37	6	25	6	.243	Lost First round series, 1–2 (Canisius)	
2016–17	Atlantic Hockey	28	3	23	2	–	–	–	8	11th	39	5	31	3	.167	Lost First round series, 1–2 (RIT)	
Jason Lammers (2017–Present)
2017–18	Atlantic Hockey	28	10	15	3	–	–	–	23	T–9th	36	11	22	3	.347	Lost First round series, 0–2 (American International)	
2018–19	Atlantic Hockey	28	11	12	5	–	–	–	27	6th	41	17	19	5	.476	Won First round series, 2–1 (Canisius); Won Quarterfinal series, 2–0 (Air Force); Won Semifinal, 1–0 (OT) (RIT); Lost Championship, 2–3 (OT) (American International)	
2019–20	Atlantic Hockey	28	12	12	4	–	–	2	42	5th	34	12	18	4	.412	Tournament Cancelled	
2020–21	Atlantic Hockey	15	3	9	3	0	2	1	.333	9th	22	7	12	3	.386	Won First round, 3–2 (Mercyhurst); Won Quarterfinal series, 2–1 (Robert Morris); Lost Semifinals, 2–1 (American International)	
2021–22	Atlantic Hockey	26	10	13	3	2	2	1	34	T–8th	36	11	22	3	.347	Lost First round series, 0–2 (Bentley)	
2022–23	Atlantic Hockey	26	10	13	3	0	3	2	38	6th	40	19	18	3	.513	Won Quarterfinal series, 2–1 (Sacred Heart); Lost Semifinal series, 1–2 (Canisius)	
2023–24	Atlantic Hockey	26	13	10	3	3	1	1	41	T–6th	39	18	18	3	.500	Won First Round, 4–1 (Army); Won Quarterfinal series, 2–0 (Sacred Heart); Lost Semifinal series, 0–2 (RIT)	
2024–25	AHA	26	16	9	1	1	2	1	48	4th	37	18	16	3	.527	Lost Quarterfinal series, 1–2 (Army)	
2025–26	AHA	26	9	16	1	1	3	0	30	8th	37	13	23	1	.365	Won First Round, 5–4 (Army); Lost Quarterfinal series, 0–2 (Sacred Heart)	
Totals											GP	W	L	T	%	Championships	
Regular Season											999	424	464	111	.480	1 ECAC West Championship, 3 CHA Championships, 1 Atlantic Hockey Championship	
Conference Post-season											78	39	37	2	.513	1 ECAC West tournament championship, 3 CHA tournament championships	
NCAA Post-season											5	1	4	0	.200	4 NCAA Tournament appearances	
Regular Season and Post-season Record											1082	464	505	113	.481		

* Winning percentage is used when conference schedules are unbalanced.
