= List of Alabama–Huntsville Chargers men's ice hockey seasons =

The Alabama–Huntsville Chargers (UAH Chargers) college ice hockey team competed as part of the National Collegiate Athletic Association (NCAA) Division I, representing the University of Alabama in Huntsville (UAH) as a member of the Western Collegiate Hockey Association. UAH played their home games at Von Braun Center in Huntsville, Alabama since the inception of the program in 1979. The Chargers claim three National Club Championships and two NCAA Division II National Championships in addition to making a pair of appearances in the NCAA Division I men's ice hockey tournament.

== Season-by-season results ==
Note: GP = Games played, W = Wins, L = Losses, T = Ties

National Champions	National Frozen Four	Conference regular season champions	Conference Playoff Champions

Season	Conference	Regular season (Note: Code explanation; GP—Games Played, W—Wins, L—Losses, T—Tied games, OTW—Overtime Wins, OTL—Overtime Loses, 3/SW—Win in 3 on 3 overtime or shootout, Pts—Points*)														Conference Tournament Results	National Tournament Results
Season	Conference	Conference									Overall					Conference Tournament Results	National Tournament Results
Season	Conference	GP	W	L	T	OTW	OTL	3/SW	Pts*	Finish	GP	W	L	T	%	Conference Tournament Results	National Tournament Results
Club
Joe Ritch (1979 — 1982)
1979–80	SCHA	20	19	1	0	—	—	—	.950	1st	22	21	1	0	.955	Won SCHA Championship	
1980–81	SCHA	23	22	1	0	—	—	—	.957	1st	28	27	1	0	.964	Won SCHA Championship	
1981–82	SCHA	16	16	0	0	—	—	—	1.000	1st	34	31	2	1	.926	Won SCHA Championship	Won National Club Championship
Doug Ross (1982 — 2007)
1982–83	CSCHL	13	13	0	0	—	—	—	1.000	1st	35	27	6	2	.800	Lost CSCHL Championship	Won National Club Championship
1983–84	CSCHL	18	18	0	0	—	—	—	1.000	1st	31	27	4	0	.871		Won National Club Championship
1984–85	CSCHL	10	8	2	0	—	—	—	.800	1st	29	21	7	1	.741	Lost CSCHL Semifinal	Lost National Club Championship
NAIA
1985–86	Independent	—	—	—	—	—	—	—	—	—	28	14	13	1	.518		
Division II
1986–87	Independent	—	—	—	—	—	—	—	—	—	30	20	10	0	.667		
Division I
1987–88	Independent	—	—	—	—	—	—	—	—	—	30	11	18	1	.383		
1988–89	Independent	—	—	—	—	—	—	—	—	—	26	15	10	1	.596		
1989–90	Independent	—	—	—	—	—	—	—	—	—	35	10	22	3	.329		
1990–91	Independent	—	—	—	—	—	—	—	—	—	32	9	21	2	.313		
1991–92	Independent	—	—	—	—	—	—	—	—	—	27	16	10	1	.611		
Division II
1992–93	Independent	—	—	—	—	—	—	—	—	—	28	15	12	1	.554		
1993–94	Independent	—	—	—	—	—	—	—	—	—	26	20	5	1	.788		Lost National Championship series, 1–2 (Bemidji State)
1994–95	Independent	—	—	—	—	—	—	—	—	—	27	20	5	2	.778		
1995–96	Independent	—	—	—	—	—	—	—	—	—	29	26	0	3	.948		Won National Championship series, 2–0 (Bemidji State)
1996–97	Independent	—	—	—	—	—	—	—	—	—	28	20	8	0	.714		Lost National Championship series, 0–2 (Bemidji State)
1997–98	Independent	—	—	—	—	—	—	—	—	—	30	24	3	3	.850		Won National Championship series, 2–0 (Bemidji State)
Division I
1998–99	Independent	—	—	—	—	—	—	—	—	—	27	21	5	1	.796		
1999–00	CHA	18	12	5	1	—	—	—	25	2nd	31	17	10	4	.613	Won Semifinal, 10–4 (Bemidji State); Lost Championship, 2–3 (Niagara)	
2000–01	CHA	20	15	4	1	—	—	—	31	1st	34	21	12	1	.632	Won Semifinal, 7–0 (Air Force); Lost Championship, 1–4 (Wayne State)	
2001–02	CHA	20	10	9	1	—	—	—	20	3rd	37	18	18	1	.500	Won Quarterfinal, 4–1 (Findlay); Won Semifinal, 5–2 (Bemidji State); Lost Championship, 4–5 (OT) (Wayne State)	
2002–03	CHA	20	13	5	2	—	—	—	28	1st	35	18	14	3	.557	Lost Semifinal, 1–2 (OT) (Bemidji State)	
2003–04	CHA	20	10	9	1	—	—	—	21	3rd	31	11	16	4	.419	Lost Quarterfinal, 3–5 (Wayne State)	
2004–05	CHA	20	14	5	1	—	—	—	29	2nd	32	18	10	4	.625	Won Semifinal, 4–2 (Niagara); Lost Championship, 0–3 (Bemidji State)	
2005–06	CHA	20	12	7	1	—	—	—	25	T–2nd	34	19	13	2	.588	Won Quarterfinal, 3–1 (Wayne State); Lost Semifinal, 3–4 (OT) (Bemidji State)	
2006–07	CHA	20	7	11	2	—	—	—	16	5th	36	13	20	3	.403	Won Quarterfinal, 4–3 (OT) (Wayne State); Won Semifinal, 5–3 (Niagara); Won Championship, 5–4 (OT) (Robert Morris)	Lost Regional semifinal, 2–3 (2OT) (Notre Dame)
Danton Cole (2007 — 2010)
2007–08	CHA	20	3	13	4	—	—	—	10	5th	31	6	21	4	.258	Lost Quarterfinal, 0–4 (Wayne State)	
2008–09	CHA	18	3	11	4	—	—	—	10	4th	30	5	20	5	.250	Lost Quarterfinal, 1–4 (Bemidji State)	
2009–10	CHA	18	6	10	2	—	—	—	14	T–3rd	33	12	18	3	.409	Won Semifinal, 1–0 (Robert Morris); Won Championship, 3–2 (OT) (Niagara)	Lost Regional semifinal, 1–2 (Miami)
Chris Luongo (2010 — 2012)
2010–11	Independent	—	—	—	—	—	—	—	—	—	32	4	26	2	.156		
2011–12	Independent	—	—	—	—	—	—	—	—	—	31	2	28	1	.081		
Kurt Kleinendorst (2012 — 2013)
2012–13	Independent	—	—	—	—	—	—	—	—	—	25	3	21	1	.140		
Mike Corbett (2013 — 2020)
2013–14	WCHA	28	2	25	1	—	—	—	5	10th	38	2	35	1	.066		
2014–15	WCHA	28	7	20	1	—	—	—	15	T-8th	38	8	28	2	.237	Lost First round series, 0–2 (Michigan Tech)	
2015–16	WCHA	28	5	17	6	—	—	—	16	10th	34	7	21	6	.294		
2016–17	WCHA	28	9	16	3	—	—	0	30	9th	34	9	22	3	.309		
2017–18	WCHA	28	10	16	2	—	—	1	33	7th	37	12	23	2	.351	Lost First round series, 1–2 (Northern Michigan)	
2018–19	WCHA	28	8	18	2	—	—	2	28	8th	38	8	28	2	.237	Lost First round series, 0–2 (Minnesota State)	
2019–20	WCHA	28	2	20	6	—	—	1	13	10th	34	2	26	6	.147		
Lance West (2020 — 2021)
2020–21	WCHA	14	3	11	0	1	0	0	8	7th	22	3	18	1	.159	Lost Quarterfinal series, 0–2 (Lake Superior State)	
Totals											GP	W	L	T	%	Championships	
Regular season											1092	442	569	81	.442	2 CHA Championships	
Conference Post-season											29	12	17	0	.414	2 CHA tournament championships	
NCAA Post-season											11	5	6	0	.455	4 D–II NCAA Tournament Appearances, 2 D–I NCAA Tournament Appearances	
Regular season and Post-season Record											1130	459	590	81	.442	2 D–II NCAA national championships	

- Club records are not included in the totals.

* Winning percentage is used when conference schedules are unbalanced.
