= CHA Most Valuable Player in Tournament =

- Sport: Ice hockey
- Awarded for: The Most Valuable Player in the CHA Tournament

History
- First award: 2000
- Final award: 2010
- Most recent: Cameron Talbot

The CHA Most Valuable Player in Tournament was an annual award given out at the conclusion of the College Hockey America conference tournament to the best player in the championship as voted by the coaches of each CHA team.

The Most Valuable Player in Tournament was first awarded in 2000 and every year thereafter until 2010, when the CHA was disbanded when they could no longer retain their automatic bid to the NCAA Tournament.

== Award winners ==
Year	Winner	Position	School
2000	Kyle Martin	Forward	Niagara
2001	David Guerrera	Goaltender	Wayne State
2002	Dustin Kingston	Forward	Wayne State
2003	Marc St. Jean	Defenceman	Wayne State
2004	Jeff Van Nynatten	Goaltender	Niagara
2005	Matt Climie	Goaltender	Bemidji State
2006	Jean-Guy Gervais	Right wing	Bemidji State
2007	David Nimmo	Center	Alabama-Huntsville
2008	Ted Cook	Forward	Niagara
2009	Matt Read	Center	Bemidji State
2010	Cam Talbot	Goaltender	Alabama-Huntsville

=== Winners by school ===
School	Winners
Niagara	3
Alabama-Huntsville	2
Bemidji State	3
Wayne State	3

=== Winners by position ===
Position	Winners
Center	2
Right wing	1
Left wing	0
Forward	3
Defenceman	1
Goaltender	4

== See also ==
- CHA Awards
- List of CHA Men's Ice Hockey Tournament champions
