= Bill Wilkinson (ice hockey) =

Canadian ice hockey coach (born 1947)

Biographical details
- Born: April 22, 1947 (age 79); Goderich, ONT, CAN
- Education: St. Lawrence University

Playing career
- 1967–1970: St. Lawrence
- Position: Forward

Coaching career (HC unless noted)
- 1971–1978: St. Lawrence(assistant)
- 1978–1979: North Dakota (assistant)
- 1979–1982: Bowling Green (assistant)
- 1982–1999: Western Michigan
- 1999–2008: Wayne State
- 2008–2011: CH Jaca
- 2011–2012: Melbourne Mustangs

Head coaching record
- Overall: 437–469–81 (.484)
- Tournaments: 0–5 (.000)

Accomplishments and honors

Championships
- 1986 CCHA Tournament champion 2001 CHA Tournament champion 2002 CHA Champion; 2002 CHA tournament champion 2003 CHA tournament champion

Awards
- 1984 CCHA Coach of the Year; 1986 CCHA Coach of the Year; 1996 CCHA Coach of the Year; 2002 CHA Coach of the Year

William Wilkinson (born April 22, 1947) is a retired Canadian ice hockey coach. He coached the Wayne State Warriors men's ice hockey program for its entire 9-year existence at the Division I level. Prior to that, Wilkinson coach the Western Michigan for seventeen seasons.

== Career ==
Wilkinson played for St. Lawrence for three years, leading the team in scoring as a sophomore and serving as the team captain in his senior season. After graduating in 1970 Wilkinson taught high school for a year before returning to Canton as an assistant coach for his alma mater.

Wilkinson served as an assistant for St. Lawrence for seven years, leaving to accept a similar position at North Dakota for one season. He spent a further three seasons as an assistant at Bowling Green under Jerry York before getting his first head coaching job at Western Michigan. After a poor showing in his first year the Broncos produced their first 20+ win season at the D-I level, earning Wilkinson the CCHA Coach of the Year. Two years later Wilkinson got the Broncos to surprising 32-win season, the program's only 30-win season (as of 2018), won the CCHA Tournament and reached the NCAA tournament for the first time. The team declined to a mediocre level for much of the next seven years before finally returning to the NCAA tournament in 1994. The Broncos made another trip to the playoffs two years later but remained winless in NCAA postseason play under Wilkinson.

During the 1998–99 season two of Wilkinson's players were arrested at a team party in a building that Wilkinson owned. An internal investigation was started and the entire team was subsequently suspended for violations of NCAA regulations. Wilkinson was eventually fired as head coach on February 3 but allowed to remain at the university as a special assistant to the AD. Once the season was over Wilkinson formally left and later took over as head coach for the newly created program at Wayne State. The Warriors played as an independent for one season before joining the CHA. Wayne State produced a modest record their first season in conference but won both of their games in the CHA Tournament to earn Wilkinson his second conference championship. The Warriors followed that up by winning 20 games the next year, winning the CHA regular season title and claiming their second consecutive championship. With all of that team success Wilkinson was awarded with the CHA Coach of the Year. In 2003, with the NCAA tournament expanding to 16 teams, the CHA was to receive its first automatic bid and the two-time champions didn't disappoint, winning 20 games once more and claiming their third consecutive tournament championship. In the tournament Wayne State was set against the #2 overall seed Colorado College and, despite a valiant effort, could not overcome three power play goals from the Tigers.

After their three year run the Warriors declined sharply and never produced another winning record. In 2007 the university announced it was shuttering the men's team, citing a $500K annual operating cost coupled with no on-campus rink and a troubled economy.

Wilkinson continued to coach after Wayne State shut down, spending three seasons with CH Jaca and then a six-month stint with the Melbourne Mustangs before retiring.

== Career statistics ==
			Regular season
Season	Team	League	GP	G	A	Pts	PIM
1967–68	St. Lawrence Saints	NCAA	24	15	21	36	–
1968–69	St. Lawrence Saints	NCAA	–	–	–	–	–
1969–70	St. Lawrence Saints	NCAA	–	–	–	–	–
NCAA totals			75	30	66	96	–

== Head coaching record ==
Record table
Season	Team	Overall	Conference	Standing	Postseason
Western Michigan Broncos (CCHA) (1982–1999)
1982–83	Western Michigan	11–23–2	10–20–2	t-9th	
1983–84	Western Michigan	22–18–2	13–14–1	5th	CCHA runner-up
1984–85	Western Michigan	22–16–2	18–13–1	3rd	CCHA quarterfinals
1985–86	Western Michigan	32–12–0	23–9–0	T–2nd	NCAA quarterfinals
1986–87	Western Michigan	23–20–0	16–16–0	5th	CCHA consolation game (loss)
1987–88	Western Michigan	22–17–3	17–12–3	4th	CCHA consolation game (loss)
1988–89	Western Michigan	14–23–6	9–17–6	6th	CCHA quarterfinals
1989–90	Western Michigan	14–24–2	12–18–2	T–5th	CCHA quarterfinals
1990–91	Western Michigan	22–17–3	16–14–2	4th	CCHA consolation game (win)
1991–92	Western Michigan	16–14–6	14–12–6	4th	CCHA quarterfinals
1992–93	Western Michigan	20–16–2	17–11–2	5th	CCHA first round
1993–94	Western Michigan	24–13–3	18–10–2	4th	NCAA East Regional Quarterfinals
1994–95	Western Michigan	17–18–5	9–14–4	T–6th	CCHA quarterfinals
1995–96	Western Michigan	27–11–3	21–6–3	T-3rd	NCAA East Regional Quarterfinals
1996–97	Western Michigan	14–18–5	10–12–5	T–5th	CCHA quarterfinals
1997–98	Western Michigan	10–25–3	9–19–2	9th	
1998–99	Western Michigan	3–16–6†	2–13–6†		
Western Michigan:		313–301–53	234–230–47		
Wayne State Warriors Independent (1999–2000)
1999–00	Wayne State	12–16–2			
Wayne State:		12–16–2			
Wayne State Warriors (CHA) (2000–2008)
2000–01	Wayne State	18–14–3	8–9–3	3rd	CHA Champion
2001–02	Wayne State	21–11–4	15–2–3	1st	CHA Champion
2002–03	Wayne State	21–17–2	11–7–2	T–3rd	NCAA Midwest Regional semifinal
2003–04	Wayne State	9–24–3	5–15–1	6th	CHA semifinals
2004–05	Wayne State	14–17–4	7–9–4	4th	CHA quarterfinals
2005–06	Wayne State	6–23–6	3–12–5	6th	CHA quarterfinals
2006–07	Wayne State	12–21–2	8–10–2	4th	CHA quarterfinals
2007–08	Wayne State	11–25–2	6–14–0	4th	CHA semifinals
Wayne State:		112–152–26	63–78–20		
Total:		437–469–81			
National champion Postseason invitational champion Conference regular season champion Conference regular season and conference tournament champion Division regular season champion Division regular season and conference tournament champion Conference tournament champion

† Wilkinson was fired in the midst of an internal investigation into team activities.

== See also ==
- List of college men's ice hockey coaches with 400 wins

Awards and achievements
Preceded by Jerry Welsh; Ron Mason; Buddy Powers	CCHA Coach of the Year; 1983–84; 1985–86; 1995–96	Succeeded by Ron Mason; Val Belmonte; Mark Mazzoleni
Preceded by Craig Barnett	CHA Coach of the Year; 2001–02	Succeeded by Doug Ross
