= 1999–2000 Alabama–Huntsville Chargers men's ice hockey season =

American college ice hockey team season

1999–2000 Alabama–Huntsville Chargers men's ice hockey
- Conference: College Hockey America
- Record: 17–10–4 (12–5–1 CHA)
- Head coach: Doug Ross (18th season)
- Home stadium: Von Braun Center

The 1999–2000 Alabama–Huntsville Chargers ice hockey team represented the University of Alabama in Huntsville in the 1999–2000 NCAA Division I men's ice hockey season. The Chargers were coached by Doug Ross who was in his eighteenth season as head coach. The Chargers played their home games in the Von Braun Center. The team joined the new College Hockey America conference after one season as a Division I independent.

== Roster ==
No.	Nat.	Player	Class	Pos	Height	Weight	DoB	Hometown	Previous team
1		Mark Byrne	Freshman	G	5' 10" (1.78 m)	170 lb (77 kg)	1978-03-22	Nepean, Ontario	Penticton (BCHL)
2		Shane Stewart	Senior	D	6' 1" (1.85 m)	200 lb (91 kg)	1975-06-17	New Liskeard, Ontario	Stratford (MWJHL)
3		David Halliwill	Freshman	D	6' 1" (1.85 m)	190 lb (86 kg)	1979-04-28	Windsor, Ontario	Chatham (GOJHL)
4		Kevin Ridgeway	Sophomore	D	6' 2" (1.88 m)	200 lb (91 kg)	1979-01-26	Ottawa, Ontario	Nepean (CJHL)
6		Ian Fletcher	Freshman	D	6' 1" (1.85 m)	195 lb (88 kg)	1978-07-07	Delta, British Columbia	Victoria (BCHL)
7		Marc Lalonde	Senior	D	6' 1" (1.85 m)	175 lb (79 kg)	1976-08-31	Cambridge, Ontario	Cambridge (MWJHL)
8		Ryan Leasa	Freshman	D	6' 1" (1.85 m)	175 lb (79 kg)	1980-05-18	Sarnia, Ontario	Sarnia (GOJHL)
9		Steve Charlebois	Freshman	RW	5' 9" (1.75 m)	170 lb (77 kg)	1978-09-01	Carbon, Alberta	Penticton (BCHL)
10		Darren Curry	Sophomore	RW	5' 11" (1.8 m)	190 lb (86 kg)	1977-03-10	Manotick, Ontario	Nepean (CJHL)
11		Nathan Bowen	Senior	LW	6' 1" (1.85 m)	200 lb (91 kg)	1975-09-03	London, Ontario	Petrolia (WOHL)
12		Tom Williams	Junior	RW	5' 10" (1.78 m)	180 lb (82 kg)	1976-11-19	Windsor, Ontario	Leamington (WOHL)
14		Ron Baker	Sophomore	C	6' 1" (1.85 m)	180 lb (82 kg)	1977-02-02	Oshawa, Ontario	Bowmanville (OPJHL)
15		Jessi Otis	Sophomore	LW	6' 1" (1.85 m)	190 lb (86 kg)	1978-03-04	Calgary, Alberta	Portage (MJHL)
16		Dwayne Blais	Junior	LW	5' 9" (1.75 m)	180 lb (82 kg)	1977-07-12	Sudbury, Ontario	Markham (MetJHL)
17		Jay Woodcroft	Senior	C	6' 1" (1.85 m)	185 lb (84 kg)	1976-08-11	Toronto, Ontario	Markham (MetJHL)
18		Gerald Overton	Freshman	LW	5' 10" (1.78 m)	175 lb (79 kg)	1978-08-24	150 Mile House, British Columbia	Quesnel (BCHL)
19		Jason Hawes	Freshman	C	5' 11" (1.8 m)	190 lb (86 kg)	1978-06-16	Perth, Ontario	Brockville (CCHL)
20		Joel Bresciani	Freshman	RW	6' 1" (1.85 m)	200 lb (91 kg)	1978-08-17	Sherwood Park, Alberta	Vernon (BCHL)
21		Ryan McCormack	Junior	C	6' 1" (1.85 m)	180 lb (82 kg)	1978-03-04	Thunder Bay, Ontario	Portage (MJHL)
22		Mike Funk	Freshman	LW	6' 1" (1.85 m)	195 lb (88 kg)	1978-11-19	Newton, Manitoba	Portage (MJHL)
23		James Kodrowski	Sophomore	D	5' 11" (1.8 m)	200 lb (91 kg)	1979-09-26	Morristown, New Jersey	Great Falls (AWHL)
25		Kārlis Zirnis	Freshman	LW	5' 11" (1.8 m)	185 lb (84 kg)	1977-11-02	Riga, Latvia	Gaylord (NAHL)
27		Tyler Butler	Freshman	D	6' 2" (1.88 m)	190 lb (86 kg)	1979-07-08	Kanata, Ontario	Kanata Valley (CCHL)
30		Steve Briere	Senior	G	5' 8" (1.73 m)	160 lb (73 kg)	1977-03-25	Winnipeg, Manitoba	Sioux City (USHL)
35		Mike Slaton	Freshman	G	5' 9" (1.75 m)	180 lb (82 kg)	1978-06-24	Plymouth, Minnesota	Bozeman (AWHL)

== Season ==
=== Schedule ===
Date	Time	Opponent	Site	Decision	Result	Attendance	Record
October 15	7:35 pm	at MSU–Mankato*	Midwest Wireless Civic Center • Mankato, Minnesota	Byrne	T 3–3 ^{OT}	2,866	0–0–1
October 16	7:35 pm	at MSU–Mankato*	Midwest Wireless Civic Center • Mankato, Minnesota	Briere	W 4–0	3,225	1–0–1
October 22	7:00 pm	Mercyhurst*	Von Braun Center • Huntsville, Alabama	Briere	T 3–3 ^{OT}	2,135	1–0–2
October 23	7:00 pm	Mercyhurst*	Von Braun Center • Huntsville, Alabama	Byrne	T 3–3 ^{OT}	2,315	1–0–3
November 5	7:00 pm	Air Force	Von Braun Center • Huntsville, Alabama	Briere	W 4–0	2,178	2–0–3 (1–0–0)
November 6	7:00 pm	Air Force	Von Braun Center • Huntsville, Alabama	Briere	W 5–2	2,057	3–0–3 (2–0–0)
November 12	6:00 pm	at Niagara	Dwyer Arena • Lewiston, New York	Briere	L 1–7	1,342	3–1–3 (2–1–0)
November 13	6:00 pm	at Niagara	Dwyer Arena • Lewiston, New York	Byrne	L 0–4	945	3–2–3 (2–2–0)
November 19	7:00 pm	Wayne State*	Von Braun Center • Huntsville, Alabama	Briere	W 4–3	2,500	4–2–3 (2–2–0)
November 20	7:00 pm	Wayne State*	Von Braun Center • Huntsville, Alabama	Byrne	W 5–3	1,059	5–2–3 (2–2–0)
December 3	7:05 pm	at Bemidji State	John S. Glas Field House • Bemidji, Minnesota	Briere	W 6–4	1,678	6–2–3 (3–2–0)
December 4	7:05 pm	at Bemidji State	John S. Glas Field House • Bemidji, Minnesota	Briere	W 6–3	1,581	7–2–3 (4–2–0)
December 11	6:05 pm	at Michigan State*	Munn Ice Arena • East Lansing, Michigan	Briere	L 0–5	6,476	7–3–3 (4–2–0)
January 7	7:00 pm	Army	Von Braun Center • Huntsville, Alabama	Briere	W 2–1	4,389	8–3–3 (5–2–0)
January 8	7:00 pm	Army	Von Braun Center • Huntsville, Alabama	Byrne	W 5–1	4,107	9–3–3 (6–2–0)
January 14	7:00 pm	Niagara	Von Braun Center • Huntsville, Alabama	Briere	L 3–4 ^{OT}	2,205	9–4–3 (6–3–0)
January 15	7:00 pm	Niagara	Von Braun Center • Huntsville, Alabama	Briere	T 2–2 ^{OT}	1,359	9–4–4 (6–3–1)
January 21	6:35 pm	at Bowling Green*	BGSU Ice Arena • Bowling Green, Ohio	Briere	L 3–4	2,053	9–5–4 (6–3–1)
January 22	6:35 pm	at Bowling Green*	BGSU Ice Arena • Bowling Green, Ohio	Briere	L 1–5	2,352	9–6–4 (6–3–1)
January 28	6:00 pm	at Findlay	Clauss Ice Arena • Findlay, Ohio	Briere	W 5–4	300	10–6–4 (7–3–1)
January 29	6:00 pm	at Findlay	Clauss Ice Arena • Findlay, Ohio	Byrne	W 6–0	362	11–6–4 (8–3–1)
February 4	7:00 pm	Bemidji State	Von Braun Center • Huntsville, Alabama	Byrne	L 4–5 ^{OT}	2,633	11–7–4 (8–4–1)
February 5	7:00 pm	Bemidji State	Von Braun Center • Huntsville, Alabama	Byrne	W 6–1	2,723	12–7–4 (9–4–1)
February 11	8:00 pm	at Air Force	Cadet Ice Arena • Colorado Springs, Colorado	Briere	W 5–4 ^{OT}	1,385	13–7–4 (10–4–1)
February 12	6:00 pm	at Air Force	Cadet Ice Arena • Colorado Springs, Colorado	Byrne	L 2–3	1,396	13–8–4 (10–5–1)
February 18	7:00 pm	Findlay	Von Braun Center • Huntsville, Alabama	Briere	W 6–0	2,172	14–8–4 (11–5–1)
February 19	2:00 pm	Findlay	Von Braun Center • Huntsville, Alabama	Briere	W 5–1	1,468	15–8–4 (12–5–1)
February 25	6:05 pm	at Wayne State*	Michigan State Fairgrounds Coliseum • Detroit, Michigan	Byrne	L 3–4	1,152	15–9–4 (12–5–1)
February 26	6:05 pm	at Wayne State*	Michigan State Fairgrounds Coliseum • Detroit, Michigan	Byrne	W 7–0	1,189	16–9–4 (12–5–1)
CHA Tournament
March 11	7:00 pm	Bemidji State*	Von Braun Center • Huntsville, Alabama (CHA Tournament Semifinal)	Briere	W 10–4	2,171	17–9–4 (12–5–1)
March 12	4:00 pm	Niagara*	Von Braun Center • Huntsville, Alabama (CHA Tournament Final)	Briere	L 2–3	1,977	17–10–4 (12–5–1)
*Non-conference game. All times are in Central Time.

=== Standings ===
1999–2000 College Hockey America standings
	Conference							Overall					
	GP	W	L	T	PTS	GF	GA	GP	W	L	T	GF	GA
#13 Niagara†*	17	15	0	2	32	86	18	42	30	8	4	165	65
Alabama–Huntsville	18	12	5	1	25	73	46	31	17	10	4	121	86
Bemidji State	17	8	8	1	17	63	69	34	13	20	1	107	155
Air Force	16	6	10	0	12	44	50	39	19	18	2	131	125
Findlay	18	4	14	0	8	38	101	31	9	22	0	79	146
Army	10	1	9	0	2	21	41	33	13	18	2	102	98
Championship: Niagara † indicates conference regular season champion * indicates conference tournament champion Final rankings: USA Today/USA Hockey Magazine Top 15 Poll

=== Skaters ===
Player	Pos	Yr	GP	G	A	Pts	PIM	PPG	SHG	GWG
Nathan Bowen	LW	Sr	31	21	18	39	30	8	2	4
Dwayne Blais	LW	Jr	29	8	26	34	42	4	0	3
Ron Baker	C	So	30	11	16	27	52	4	1	3
Darren Curry	RW	So	26	13	10	23	14	9	0	0
Ryan McCormack	C	Jr	31	9	13	22	28	3	0	0
Shane Stewart	D	Sr	28	7	14	21	115	3	0	0
Jay Woodcroft	C	Sr	29	5	15	20	46	1	0	1
Kārlis Zirnis	LW	Fr	31	7	12	19	42	0	1	2
Marc Lalonde	D	Sr	28	6	13	19	42	0	0	1
Mike Funk	LW	Fr	26	8	9	17	20	2	0	1
Jessi Otis	LW	So	29	8	9	17	43	2	0	0
Tyler Butler	D	Fr	26	3	11	14	28	1	0	1
Ian Fletcher	D	Fr	19	2	9	11	12	0	0	0
Joel Bresciani	RW	Fr	31	4	4	8	68	0	1	0
Jason Hawes	C	Fr	29	2	4	6	14	0	0	0
Tom Williams	RW	Jr	14	0	6	6	16	0	0	0
Ryan Leasa	D	Fr	25	3	2	5	28	0	0	0
Gerald Overton	LW	Fr	25	1	3	4	16	1	0	0
David Halliwill	D	Fr	16	0	3	3	6	0	0	0
Steve Briere	G	Sr	23	0	3	3	18	0	0	0
Steve Charlebois	RW	Fr	25	2	0	2	18	0	1	1
Kevin Ridgeway	D	So	24	1	1	2	14	0	0	0
James Kodrowski	D	So	2	0	0	0	2	0	0	0
Mark Byrne	G	Fr	14	0	0	0	0	0	0	0
Team			31	121	201	322	714	38	6	17

=== Goaltenders ===
Player	Yr	GP	TOI	W	L	T	GA	GAA	SV	SV%	SO
Mark Byrne	Fr	14	554:57	4	4	2	23	2.42	237	0.912	1
Steve Briere	Sr	23	1333:43	13	6	2	63	2.87	577	0.902	3
