= RIT Tigers men's ice hockey records =

The RIT Tigers men's ice hockey statistical records document the individual and team achievements in the history of the RIT Tigers men's ice hockey program at the Rochester Institute of Technology. Records are tracked separately for the program's Division II/III era and its Division I era. The program's all-time records span categories including goals, assists, points, penalty minutes, wins, and shutouts, recorded at the career, season, and single-game levels.

== School records ==
Active players in bold.

=== Career ===
**Division II/III**

- Most goals in a career: Chris Johnstone, 114 (1981–85)
- Most assists in a career: Mike Bournazakis, 148 (1999–03)
- Most points in a career: Chris Johnstone, 250 (1981–85)
- Most penalty minutes in a career:
- Most points in a career, defenseman:
- Most assists in a career, defenseman: Jerry Galway, 120 (1997–99, 2000–02)
- Most wins in a career: Jaime Morris, 87 (1995–99)
- Most shutouts in a career: (tie) Tyler Euverman, 12 (1999–03); Dave Burkholder, 12 (1980–84)

**Division I**

- Most goals in a career: **Erik Brown, 56 (2015–2019)**
- Most assists in a career: Dan Ringwald, 102 (2006–10)
- Most points in a career: Cameron Burt, 138 (2008–12)
- Most penalty minutes in a career: Taylor McReynolds, 336 (2008–12)
- Most points in a career, defenseman: Dan Ringwald, 123 (2006–10)
- Most assists in a career, defenseman: Dan Ringwald, 102 (2006–10)
- Most wins in a career: Jared DeMichiel, 41 (2006–10)
- Most shutouts in a career: Shane Madolora, 13 (2009–12)

=== Season ===
==== Player ====
**Division II/III**

- Most goals in a season: Steve Toll, 39 (1996–97)
- Most assists in a season: Mike Bournazakis, 52 (2000–01)
- Most points in a season: Steve Toll, 84 (1996–97)
- Most penalty minutes in a season:
- Most points in a season, defenseman:
- Most wins in a season: Dave Burkholder, 28 (1983–84)
- Most shutouts in a season: Dave Burkholder, 7 (1983–84)
- Most power play goals in a season: Pete Bournazakis, 17 (2000–01)

**Division I**

- Most goals in a season: Matt Smith, 27 (2007–08)
- Most assists in a season: Josh Mitchell, 36 (2014–15)
- Most points in a season: Matt Garbowsky, 54 (2014–15)
- Most penalty minutes in a season: Taylor McReynolds, 138 (2010–11)
- Most points in a season, defenseman: Dan Ringwald, 37 (2009–10)
- Most wins in a season: Jared DeMichiel, 27 (2009–10)
- Most shutouts in a season: Shane Madolora, 7 (2011–12)
- Most power play goals in a season: Matt Smith, 17 (2007–08)

==== Team ====
**Division II/III**

- Most wins in a season: 31 (1985–86)
- Most overtime games in a season:
- Longest winning streak: 17 (1983–1984)

**Division I**

- Most wins in a season: 28 (2009–10)(2022-2023)
- Most overtime games in a season: 11 (2007–2008)
- Longest winning streak: 12 (February 12, 2010 – April 8, 2010)
- Longest overall unbeaten streak: 12 (February 12, 2010 – April 8, 2010)

=== Game ===
==== Player ====
**Division II/III**

- Most goals in a game: Norm McEachern, 6 (1963–64 vs. Syracuse)
- Most assists in a game: Maurice Montambault, 8 (1985–86 vs. Brockport)
- Most points in a game: (tie) Mike Bournazakis, 9 (2001–02 vs. Neumann); Maurice Montambault, 9 (1985–86 vs. Brockport)
- Most penalty minutes in a game:

**Division I**

- Most goals in a game: (tie) Brad McGowan, 4 (March 14, 2015 vs. Air Force); Erik Brown, 4 (17 February 2018 vs. Sacred Heart)
- Most assists in a game: Brent Patry, 5 (October 21, 2006 vs. AIC)
- Most points in a game: (tie) Brent Patry, 5 (October 21, 2006 vs. AIC); Cameron Burt, 5 (twice) (March 20, 2010 vs. Sacred Heart; October 15, 2011 vs. St. Lawrence)
- Most penalty minutes in a game: Tyler Mazzei, 24 (January 19, 2008 vs. Sacred Heart)

==== Team ====
**Division II/III**

- Most goals in a game: 24 (February 8, 2002 vs. Neumann)
- Most goals in a period: 10 (February 8, 2002, second period vs. Neumann)

**Division I**

- Most goals in a game: 10 (January 14, 2012 vs. Sacred Heart)
- Most goals in a period: 5 (eight times) (October 20, 2006, second period vs. AIC; January 10, 2009, second period vs. UConn; March 15, 2009, second period vs. Holy Cross; November 26, 2010, first period vs. Sacred Heart; January 14, 2012, third period vs Sacred Heart; March 14, 2015, third period vs Air Force; October 31, 2015, first period vs. AIC; February 20, 2016, second period vs. Niagara)
- Most shots in a game: 63 (March 10, 2012 vs. Bentley)
- Most shots in a period: 25 (November 17, 2007, second period vs. Mercyhurst)
- Most penalty minutes in a game: 112 (February 9, 2008 vs. Canisius)
