= 2003–04 Alabama–Huntsville Chargers men's ice hockey season =

American college ice hockey team season

2003–04 Alabama–Huntsville Chargers men's ice hockey
- Conference: College Hockey America
- Record: 11–16–4 (10–9–1 CHA)
- Head coach: Doug Ross (22nd season)
- Captain: Steve Milosevski
- Alternate captain: Jared Ross, Jeremy Schreiber
- Home stadium: Von Braun Center

The 2003–04 Alabama–Huntsville Chargers ice hockey team represented the University of Alabama in Huntsville in the 2003–04 NCAA Division I men's ice hockey season. The Chargers were coached by Doug Ross who was in his twenty-second season as head coach. The Chargers played their home games in the Von Braun Center and were members of the College Hockey America conference.

== Roster ==
No.	Nat.	Player	Class	Pos	Height	Weight	DoB	Hometown	Previous team
2		John Bradley	Senior	D	6' 2" (1.88 m)	210 lb (95 kg)	1980-09-16	Hermantown, Minnesota	Billings (AWHL)
3		Brett McConnachie	Freshman	RW	5' 10" (1.78 m)	185 lb (84 kg)	1985-03-01	Ajax, Ontario	Wexford (OJHL)
4		Jeremy Schreiber (A)	Sophomore	D	6' 1" (1.85 m)	200 lb (91 kg)	1981-07-04	Medicine Hat, Alberta	Canmore (AJHL)
5		Ryan Brown	Junior	D	6' 1" (1.85 m)	200 lb (91 kg)	1980-03-26	Chatham, Ontario	Chatham (GOJHL)
6		A.J. Larivee	Freshman	D	6' 1" (1.85 m)	205 lb (93 kg)	1983-12-19	Dublin, Ontario	St. Marys (WOHL)
7		Jared Ross (A)	Junior	C	5' 9" (1.75 m)	165 lb (75 kg)	1982-09-18	Huntsville, Alabama	Catholic Central HS (USHS–MI)
9		Dominik Rozman	Freshman	LW	5' 11" (1.8 m)	190 lb (86 kg)	1983-03-10	Wallaceburg, Ontario	Sarnia (GOJHL)
10		Doug Watkins	Junior	D	5' 10" (1.78 m)	190 lb (86 kg)	1980-08-20	Kelowna, British Columbia	Weyburn (SJHL)
12		Jackson Harren	Senior	LW	6' 2" (1.88 m)	210 lb (95 kg)	1980-03-10	Warroad, Minnesota	Dubuque (USHL)
13		Bruce Mulherin	Sophomore	C	6' 1" (1.85 m)	190 lb (86 kg)	1982-02-03	Red Deer, Alberta	Olds (AJHL)
14		Todd Bentley	Sophomore	LW	5' 10" (1.78 m)	190 lb (86 kg)	1982-01-07	Livonia, Michigan	Cedar Rapids (USHL)
15		Grant Selinger	Freshman	C	5' 11" (1.8 m)	180 lb (82 kg)	1983-03-22	Regina, Saskatchewan	South Surrey (BCHL)
16		Craig Bushey	Junior	RW	5' 10" (1.78 m)	180 lb (82 kg)	1980-02-27	Ignace, Ontario	Cleveland (NAHL)
18		Steve Canter	Freshman	RW	6' 1" (1.85 m)	190 lb (86 kg)	1983-06-29	St. Louis, Missouri	Billings (AWHL)
19		Shaun Arvai	Freshman	D	5' 10" (1.78 m)	170 lb (77 kg)	1982-10-06	West Lorne, Ontario	Petrolia (WOHL)
21		Steve Milosevski (C)	Senior	LW	6' 1" (1.85 m)	190 lb (86 kg)	1978-12-18	Windsor, Ontario	Tecumseh (WOHL)
22		David Nimmo	Freshman	C	6' 3" (1.91 m)	200 lb (91 kg)	1982-07-25	St. Albert, Alberta	Melfort (SJHL)
23		Keith Rowe	Junior	LW	5' 11" (1.8 m)	190 lb (86 kg)	1981-04-13	Livonia, Michigan	Danville (NAHL)
24		Jeff Winchester	Sophomore	D	6' 3" (1.91 m)	220 lb (100 kg)	1981-11-06	Dalhousie, New Brunswick	Cornwall (CCHL)
25		Chris Martini	Sophomore	LW	6' 1" (1.85 m)	185 lb (84 kg)	1982-07-11	Calgary, Alberta	Canmore (AJHL)
26		Luke Flaig	Sophomore	C	5' 11" (1.8 m)	175 lb (79 kg)	1981-09-18	Eden Prairie, Minnesota	Chicago (USHL)
27		Troy Maney	Freshman	D	6' 2" (1.88 m)	200 lb (91 kg)	1982-10-04	Huntsville, Alabama	Capital Centre (NAHL)
29		Scott Munroe	Sophomore	G	6' 2" (1.88 m)	195 lb (88 kg)	1982-01-20	Moose Jaw, Saskatchewan	Notre Dame (SJHL)
30		Adam MacLean	Senior	G	5' 11" (1.8 m)	165 lb (75 kg)	1980-07-04	Woodstock, Ontario	St. Marys (WOHL)
33		Marc Narduzzi	Freshman	G	6' 2" (1.88 m)	190 lb (86 kg)	1982-05-25	Vancouver, British Columbia	South Surrey (BCHL)

== Season ==
=== Schedule ===
Date	Time	Opponent	Site	Decision	Result	Attendance	Record
Regular Season
October 24	7:05 pm	Connecticut*	Von Braun Center • Huntsville, Alabama	Munroe	L 1–4	2,147	0–1–0 (0–0–0)
October 25	7:05 pm	Connecticut*	Von Braun Center • Huntsville, Alabama	MacLean	W 6–0	1,481	1–1–0 (0–0–0)
October 31	7:05 pm	Air Force	Von Braun Center • Huntsville, Alabama	MacLean	W 5–1	1,447	2–1–0 (1–0–0)
November 1	7:05 pm	Air Force	Von Braun Center • Huntsville, Alabama	Munroe	W 6–4	1,655	3–1–0 (2–0–0)
November 7	6:35 pm	at Miami (OH)*	Goggin Ice Arena • Oxford, Ohio	MacLean	L 2–4	2,055	3–2–0 (2–0–0)
November 8	6:35 pm	at Miami (OH)*	Goggin Ice Arena • Oxford, Ohio	Munroe	L 2–5	2,189	3–3–0 (2–0–0)
December 5	6:05 pm	at Niagara	Dwyer Arena • Lewiston, New York	MacLean	L 1–2	795	3–4–0 (2–1–0)
December 6	6:05 pm	at Niagara	Dwyer Arena • Lewiston, New York	Munroe	L 1–3	1,057	3–5–0 (2–2–0)
December 11	7:05 pm	Bemidji State	Von Braun Center • Huntsville, Alabama	MacLean	W 7–5	1,024	4–5–0 (3–2–0)
December 13	5:35 pm	Bemidji State	Von Braun Center • Huntsville, Alabama	Munroe	L 3–5	2,164	4–6–0 (3–3–0)
January 3	6:00 pm	at Holy Cross*	Hart Recreation Center • Worcester, Massachusetts	MacLean	L 4–5	103	4–7–0 (3–3–0)
January 4	3:00 pm	at Holy Cross*	Hart Recreation Center • Worcester, Massachusetts	Munroe	T 2–2 ^{OT}	890	4–7–1 (3–3–0)
January 10	4:05 pm	Findlay	Von Braun Center • Huntsville, Alabama	MacLean	W 4–1	1,479	5–7–1 (4–3–0)
January 11	4:05 pm	Findlay	Von Braun Center • Huntsville, Alabama	Munroe	W 3–1	1,220	6–7–1 (5–3–0)
January 17	2:05 pm	at Wayne State	Compuware Sports Arena • Plymouth, Michigan	MacLean	W 5–2	559	7–7–1 (6–3–0)
January 18	1:05 pm	at Wayne State	Compuware Sports Arena • Plymouth, Michigan	Munroe	W 7–3	543	8–7–1 (7–3–0)
January 23	8:05 pm	at Air Force	Cadet Ice Arena • Colorado Springs, Colorado	MacLean	L 1–3	1,068	8–8–1 (7–4–0)
January 24	8:05 pm	at Air Force	Cadet Ice Arena • Colorado Springs, Colorado	Munroe	W 6–2	2,052	9–8–1 (8–4–0)
January 30	5:35 pm	Northern Michigan*	Von Braun Center • Huntsville, Alabama	Munroe	L 2–3	1,912	9–9–1 (8–4–0)
January 31	1:35 pm	Northern Michigan*	Von Braun Center • Huntsville, Alabama	MacLean	T 3–3 ^{OT}	1,753	9–9–2 (8–4–0)
February 6	6:00 pm	at #3 Maine*	Alfond Arena • Orono, Maine	Munroe	L 0–1	5,395	9–10–2 (8–4–0)
February 7	6:00 pm	at #3 Maine*	Alfond Arena • Orono, Maine	MacLean	T 2–2 ^{OT}	5,517	9–10–3 (8–4–0)
February 12	7:05 pm	Niagara	Von Braun Center • Huntsville, Alabama	Munroe	L 0–8	1,352	9–11–3 (8–5–0)
February 13	5:35 pm	Niagara	Von Braun Center • Huntsville, Alabama	MacLean	W 4–2	1,462	10–11–3 (9–5–0)
February 20	7:35 pm	at Bemidji State	John S. Glas Field House • Bemidji, Minnesota	MacLean	T 3–3 ^{OT}	1,225	10–11–4 (9–5–1)
February 21	7:05 pm	at Bemidji State	John S. Glas Field House • Bemidji, Minnesota	Munroe	L 2–4	1,227	10–12–4 (9–6–1)
February 28	3:05 pm	Wayne State	Von Braun Center • Huntsville, Alabama	Munroe	L 2–4	1,272	10–13–4 (9–7–1)
February 29	4:05 pm	Wayne State	Von Braun Center • Huntsville, Alabama	MacLean	L 1–4	N/A	10–14–4 (9–8–1)
March 5	6:05 pm	at Findlay	Clauss Ice Arena • Findlay, Ohio	MacLean	L 1–2	153	10–15–4 (9–9–1)
March 6	6:05 pm	at Findlay	Clauss Ice Arena • Findlay, Ohio	Munroe	W 3–1	358	11–15–4 (10–9–1)
CHA Tournament
March 12	7:05 pm	Wayne State*	Tri-City Arena • Kearney, Nebraska (CHA Tournament Quarterfinal)	MacLean	L 3–5	1,048	11–16–4 (10–9–1)
*Non-conference game. All times are in Central Time.

=== Standings ===
2003–04 College Hockey America standings
	Conference							Overall					
	GP	W	L	T	PTS	GF	GA	GP	W	L	T	GF	GA
Bemidji State†	20	16	3	1	33	90	48	36	20	13	3	131	94
Niagara*	20	14	6	0	28	72	52	39	21	15	3	124	120
Alabama–Huntsville	20	10	9	1	21	65	60	31	11	16	4	92	94
Findlay	20	7	11	2	16	58	60	38	11	22	5	95	114
Air Force	20	6	13	1	13	49	78	37	14	21	2	101	131
Wayne State	20	4	15	1	9	44	80	36	9	24	3	83	144
Championship: Niagara † indicates conference regular season champion * indicates conference tournament champion Final rankings: USA Today/USA Hockey Magazine Top 15 Poll

=== Statistics ===
==== Skaters ====
Player	Pos	Yr	GP	G	A	Pts	PIM	PPG	SHG	GWG
Jared Ross	C	Jr	31	19	31	50	46	10	1	2
Craig Bushey	RW	Jr	31	16	16	32	44	7	1	1
Bruce Mulherin	C	So	22	8	16	24	28	1	1	1
Jeremy Schreiber	D	So	31	10	11	21	18	6	0	1
Brett McConnachie	RW	Fr	31	7	9	16	38	1	0	1
Ryan Brown	D	Jr	30	2	14	16	26	1	0	0
Todd Bentley	LW	So	30	6	9	15	30	0	0	0
Steve Canter	RW	Fr	31	6	5	11	45	1	0	2
Grant Selinger	C	Fr	20	4	6	10	36	3	0	0
Steve Milosevski	LW	Sr	28	4	6	10	8	0	0	1
Jeff Winchester	D	So	30	2	7	9	113	1	0	0
Shaun Arvai	D	Fr	29	2	4	6	8	0	0	0
Doug Watkins	D	Jr	29	2	4	6	97	0	1	2
Chris Martini	LW	So	23	1	4	5	16	0	1	0
Keith Rowe	LW	Jr	26	1	3	4	49	0	1	0
Jackson Harren	LW	Sr	31	1	2	3	2	0	0	0
A.J. Larivee	D	Fr	31	1	2	3	6	0	0	0
Dominik Rozman	LW	Fr	26	0	3	3	17	0	0	0
Adam MacLean	G	Sr	18	0	1	1		0	0	0
David Nimmo	C	Fr	26	0	1	1	8	0	0	0
John Bradley	D	Sr	1	0	0	0	0	0	0	0
Luke Flaig	C	So	7	0	0	0	4	0	0	0
Troy Maney	D	Fr	12	0	0	0	0	0	0	0
Scott Munroe	G	So	17	0	0	0		0	0	0
Team			31	92	154	246	639	31	6	11

==== Goalies ====
Player	Yr	GP	TOI	W	L	T	GA	GAA	SV	SV%	SO
Adam MacLean	Sr	18	980	6	7	3	43	2.63	446	0.912	0
Scott Munroe	So	17	891	5	9	1	47	3.16	436	0.903	0
