= Matt Climie =

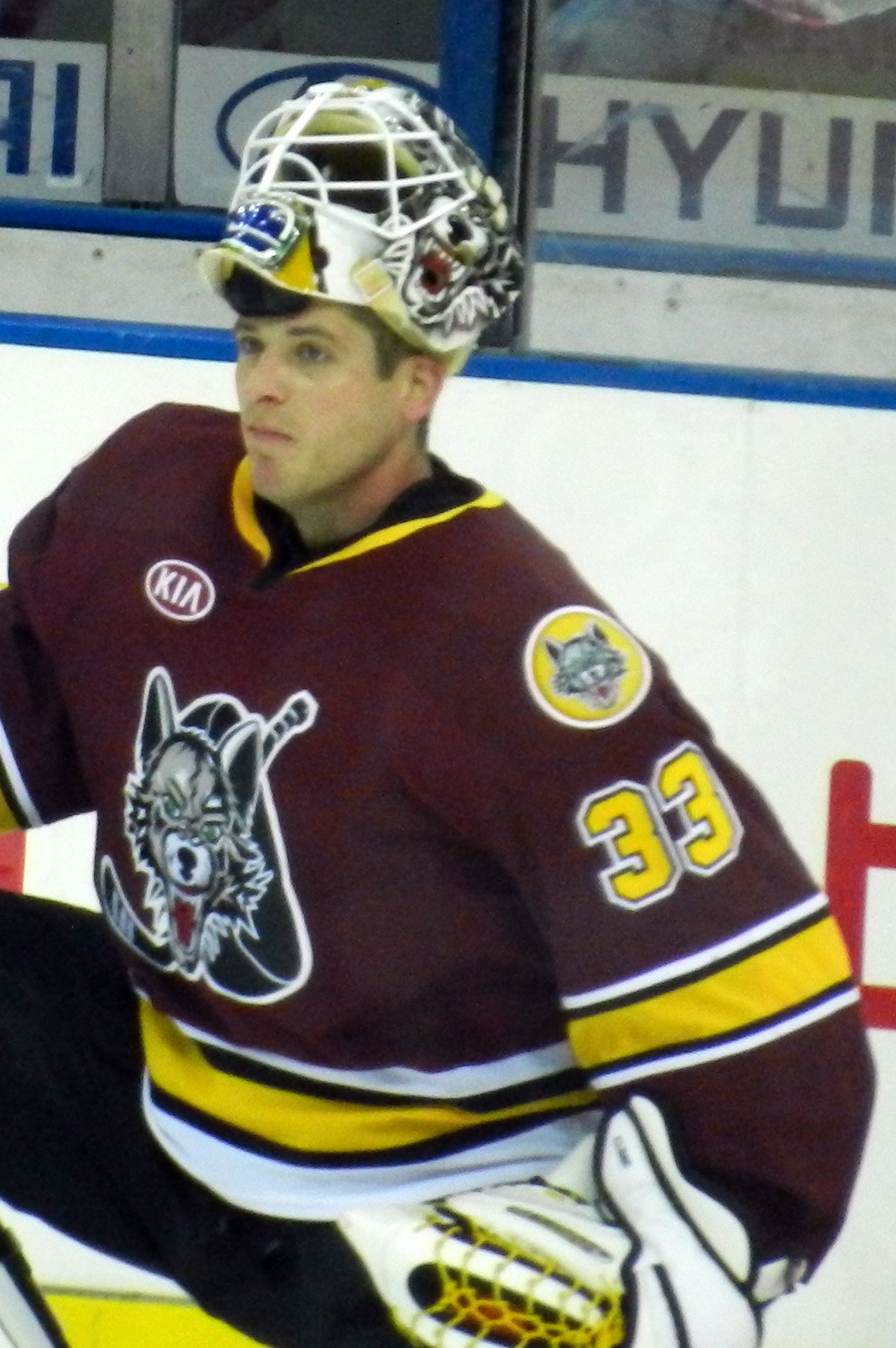
- Born: February 11, 1983 (age 43) Leduc, Alberta, Canada
- Height: 6 ft 3 in (191 cm)
- Weight: 205 lb (93 kg; 14 st 9 lb)
- Position: Goaltender
- Catches: Left
- team Former teams: Free Agent; Dallas Stars; Phoenix Coyotes; Straubing Tigers; HKm Zvolen; HC Bolzano; HC TWK Innsbruck; Sheffield Steelers; HDD Jesenice
- NHL draft: Undrafted
- Playing career: 2008–present

Matthew Scott Climie (born February 11, 1983) is a Canadian professional ice hockey goaltender. He is currently an unrestricted free agent who most recently played with the CBR Brave of the Australian Ice Hockey League (AIHL). Climie has played in the National Hockey League with the Dallas Stars and Phoenix Coyotes.

Climie played junior hockey for three different teams finishing with the Truro Bearcats in the Maritime Junior Hockey League (MJAHL). In his final season with Truro he was named an MJAHL All-Star, the season's Most Valuable Player (MVP), and shared the league's "Best Goaltending Duo" award. Following his junior career he joined the Bemidji State Beavers men's ice hockey team. In his first year with the team he helped the Beavers win the College Hockey America (CHA) tournament and was named tournament MVP. By the end of his collegiate career he set school records for shutouts as a freshman, single-season shutouts, career shutouts, and wins at the Division I level. He was also named to multiple All-CHA teams. After completing his career at Bemidji State he signed with the Stars as a free agent. After two seasons in the Stars' organization he signed with the Coyotes. He spent one year with Coyotes organization before signing with the Vancouver Canucks.

== Playing career ==
=== Amateur ===
Climie began his junior hockey career as a backup goaltender to his brother, Chris, for the Kimberley Dynamiters in the America West Hockey League. During the playoffs the team went bankrupt and ceased operation. As a result, Climie joined the Bonnyville Pontiacs in the Alberta Junior Hockey League. After one season he was traded for $500 to the Truro Bearcats in the Maritime Junior Hockey League (MJAHL). Following the trade Climie had to drive almost 3,000 miles to join his new team. He played the final two seasons of his junior eligibility with Truro. In his final season with the Bearcats he finished with a 30–10–5 record and led the MJAHL with a 2.61 goals against average (GAA). He was named an MJAHL All-Star, the season's Most Valuable Player (MVP), and won the league's "Best Goaltending Duo" award with teammate Daniel Turner.

Undrafted after his junior career, a 20-year-old Climie signed a letter of intent with Bemidji State University (BSU). He was projected to be the Beavers' third-string goaltender, despite being named one of the top ten goaltending prospects to join an NCAA Division I university. As a freshman Climie split time as a starter with Layne Sedevie, after Sedevie struggled in his sophomore season. In his first game Climie recorded a shutout against the Bentley College Falcons. In the College Hockey America (CHA) tournament Climie recorded back-to-back shutouts, defeating Air Force 6–0 and Alabama–Huntsville 3–0 in the tournament's championship game. By not allowing a goal in the tournament BSU became the first team of the existing Division I conferences to win the league tournament without allowing a goal. For his performance in the two victories Climie was named tournament MVP. Winning the CHA tournament earned BSU automatic qualification into the NCAA tournament. The Beavers matched up against defending national champion the University of Denver in the first round. Climie made 45 saves in the BSU 4–3 overtime loss. He finished the year posting a 12–5–1 record with a 1.80 GAA and 4 shutouts. His GAA was the lowest at BSU in 40 years and second lowest in the history of the CHA, while his four shutouts set a BSU freshman record. At the end of the year he was named to the CHA All-Rookie Team.

Entering his sophomore season Climie was named the CHA the preseason player of the year and Honorable Mention Preseason All-U.S. College Hockey Online. Despite the accolades Climie continued to split time with Sedevie. He faulted slightly during the year finishing with an 8–7–2 record with a 2.70 GAA and one shutout. With Clime in net the Beavers won their second straight CHA tournament and advanced to the NCAA tournament, where they were again eliminated in the first round. At the beginning of his junior season Climie continued to struggle allowing 11 goals in his first three games. He rebounded for his slow start and without a regular backup goaltender Climie played in all but four of the Beavers' games. He finished the year with the highest GAA of his collegiate career at 3.03 and won only one more game than he lost finishing with an 11–10–5 record. Even with the lowest statistical numbers of his career Climie was named First-Team All-CHA. In the 2007 CHA tournament Climie allowed 6 goals to Robert Morris University losing 7–5 in the first round. In the game Climie made 19 saves while Bemidji State allowed 4 power play goals in eight opportunities. Going into his senior year there was some question if Climie would remain the team's starting goaltender. He remained the starter for the year and posted a 14–8–3 record with a 2.16 GAA with 5 shutouts. The shutout total set a BSU single season record and he was named to the All-CHA second team. In the opening round of the 2008 CHA tournament BSU defeated Wayne State, with Climie making only 10 saves in the penalty filled 4–1 game. BSU lost in the following game, the tournament's championship, 3–2 to Niagara with Climie making 12 save in the contest. Clime finished his four-year career at BSU with a school record for career shutouts with 12, his 45 victories set a school record for Division I wins. He ranks second in BSU history with a career .909 save percentage, third in goaltender minutes played with 5,427, and sixth in saves at 2,201.

=== Professional ===
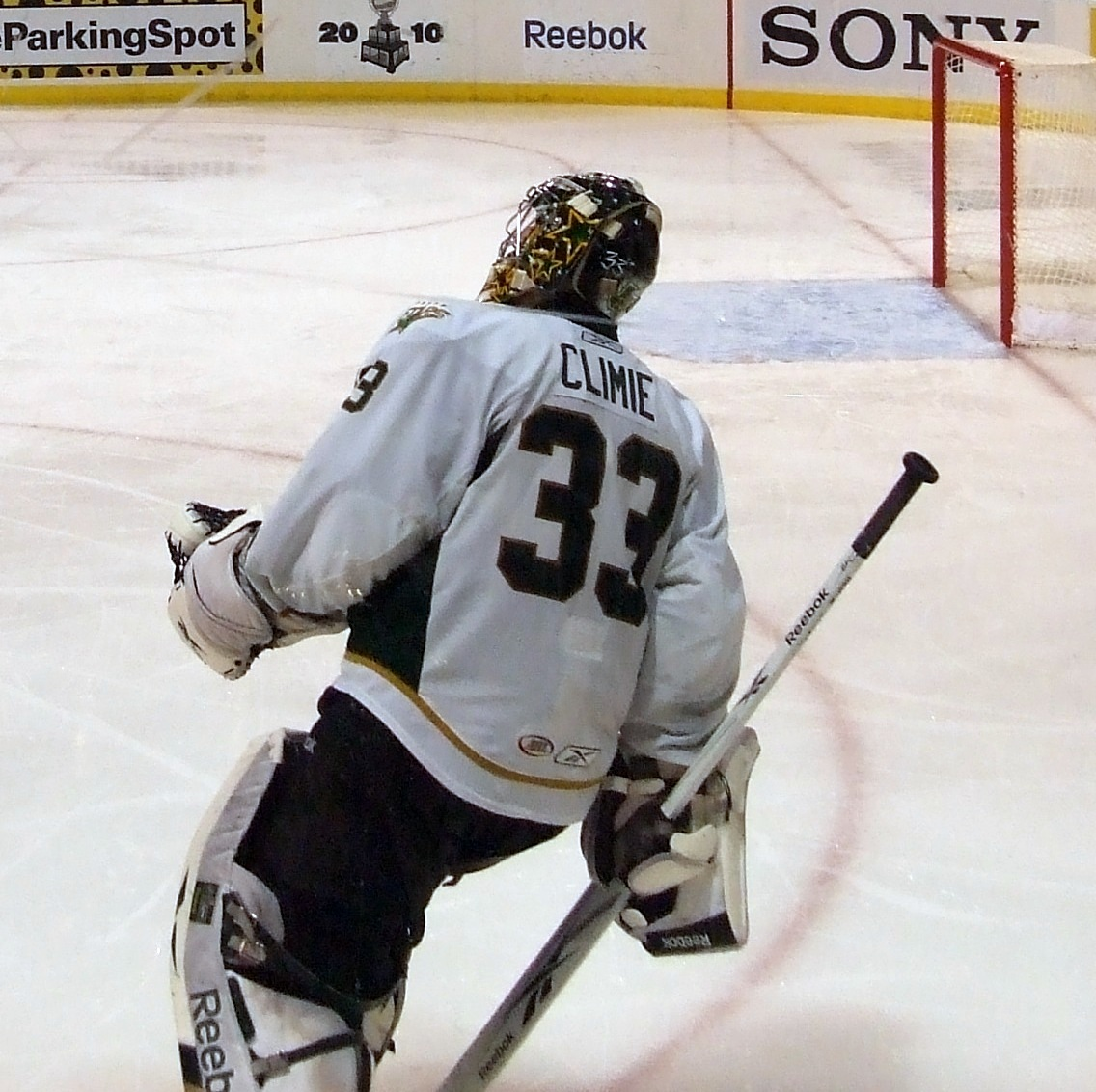
Climie playing for the Texas Stars in a 2010 playoff game.

After his college career ended Climie signed a one-year contract with the Dallas Stars. In order to join the Stars American Hockey League affiliate, the Iowa Stars, before his contract began he also signed an amateur tryout agreement for the final 12 games of the 2007–08 season. He played in 6 games for Iowa posting a 1–4–1 record with a 3.99 GAA. To start the 2008–09 season Climie was assigned to the Stars ECHL affiliate the Idaho Steelheads. With an injury to Stars' starting goaltender Marty Turco Climie was called up from Idaho on an emergency basis. At the time of his call-up he was leading the ECHL in goals against average. He made his NHL debut against the St. Louis Blues. During the game Climie made 22 saves en route to 5–4 Stars overtime victory. Making him just the fifth goaltender to win his NHL debut with the Stars on April 4, 2009. Climie started three consecutive games going 2–1–0 posting a 2.92 goals-against average and an .894 save percentage. He was reassigned to the Steelheads six days after his debut. He finished with Idaho registering a .915 save percentage, a 27–12–1 record with 4 shutouts, and an ECHL leading 2.30 GAA. After Idaho was eliminated from the playoffs Climie joined the AHL's Houston Aeros, where he was part of goaltending rotation with three other net minders. The Aeros reached the Western Conference Finals before being eliminated with Climie playing in 5 games going 1–1.

In the off-season he was re-signed to another one-year two-way contract. He played the majority of the season with the newly established Texas Stars, but was called up and played in one game for Dallas. Entering the playoffs Climie was the backup goaltender, but a concussion to Brent Krahn elevated him to the starting role. With Climie in net the Stars advanced to the Calder Cup Finals. Playing against the heavily favored Hershey Bears, Texas took a 2–0 series lead on the road. In game 3 the Stars took a 3–1 lead before giving up 5 straight goals to Hersey losing 6–3. The Bears won the next two games giving them the 3–2 series lead and a chance to win the Calder Cup in game 6. With Texas facing elimination Climie was benched in favor of Krahn who returned from his injury. Texas lost the game 4–0 as Hershey won its eleventh Championship.

Following his playoff performance Clime was seeking a one-way contract. Unable to come to an agreement with Dallas Climie signed a one-year two-way contract as a free agent with the Phoenix Coyotes. Climie began the season with the Coyotes AHL affiliate the San Antonio Rampage. After 20 games Climie was called up to the Coyotes to backup goaltender Jason LaBarbera, while starter Ilya Bryzgalov was out with the flu. During the December 20 game against the Pittsburgh Penguins LaBarbera gave up five goals in the first two periods and was pulled. Climie entered the game and played 32 minutes making 15 saves on 16 shots. It was the only game he played for Phoenix. Finishing the year in San Antonio he set a career high in games played with 56. In the off-season Climie again changes teams, signing a one-year contract with the Vancouver Canucks. Though it was called an odd destination considering the goaltending depth of the Canucks, speculation of possible trade of one of Vancouver's established goaltenders would open a potential NHL opportunity. Climie was assigned to the Canucks affiliate the Chicago Wolves. He was called up once to the Canucks to serve as the backup to Cory Schneider following an injury to Roberto Luongo, but did not appear in the game. Teaming with Wolves starter Eddie Lack the duo set a franchise record for lowest team GAA at 2.54. Though he signed a one-year two-way deal with the Canucks he also signed a one-way deal with the Wolves for the 2012–13 season.

After four seasons with the Chicago Wolves, and season professional seasons in North America, Climie signed his first contract abroad in agreeing to a deal with German club, the Straubing Tigers of the Deutsche Eishockey Liga on May 12, 2015.

After spending the 2017–18 season, appearing in the Slovak Extraliga with HKm Zvolen and making a solitary appearance with HCB South Tyrol in the Austrian Hockey League. Climie as a free agent opted to continue in the EBEL, securing a one-year deal with Austrian club, HC TWK Innsbruck on April 21, 2018.

On April 14, 2019, the CBR Brave of the Australian Ice Hockey League announced that Climie would be the team's starting goaltender for the 2019 AIHL season.

== Career statistics ==
			Regular season									Playoffs
Season	Team	League	GP	W	L	T/OT	MIN	GA	SO	GAA	SV%	GP	W	L	MIN	GA	SO	GAA	SV%
2000–01	Kimberley Dynamiters	AWHL	26	—	—	—	—	—	—	—	—	—	—	—	—	—	—	—	—
2002–03	Truro Bearcats	MJHL	33	—	—	—	—	—	—	—	—	—	—	—	—	—	—	—	—
2003–04	Truro Bearcats	MJHL	45	30	10	0	2,731	119	0	2.61	.926	—	—	—	—	—	—	—	—
2004–05	Bemidji State University	CHA	21	12	5	1	1,167	35	4	1.80	.916	—	—	—	—	—	—	—	—
2005–06	Bemidji State University	CHA	18	8	7	2	1,065	48	1	2.70	.913	—	—	—	—	—	—	—	—
2006–07	Bemidji State University	CHA	29	11	10	5	1,666	83	2	3.03	.897	—	—	—	—	—	—	—	—
2007–08	Bemidji State University	CHA	27	14	8	3	1,529	55	5	2.16	.913	—	—	—	—	—	—	—	—
2007–08	Iowa Stars	AHL	6	1	4	1	346	78	0	4.05	.872	—	—	—	—	—	—	—	—
2008–09	Idaho Steelheads	ECHL	42	27	12	1	2,404	92	4	2.30	.915	4	0	3	199	8	0	2.41	.924
2008–09	Dallas Stars	NHL	3	2	1	0	185	9	0	2.92	.894	—	—	—	—	—	—	—	—
2008–09	Houston Aeros	AHL	—	—	—	—	—	—	—	—	—	5	1	1	191	6	0	1.88	.945
2009–10	Texas Stars	AHL	43	21	17	3	2,539	104	3	2.46	.919	15	7	6	885	40	0	2.71	.916
2009–10	Dallas Stars	NHL	1	0	1	0	60	5	0	5.00	.868	—	—	—	—	—	—	—	—
2010–11	San Antonio Rampage	AHL	55	26	22	3	3,040	134	3	2.64	.913	—	—	—	—	—	—	—	—
2010–11	Phoenix Coyotes	NHL	1	0	0	0	32	1	0	1.88	.938	—	—	—	—	—	—	—	—
2011–12	Chicago Wolves	AHL	32	20	11	0	1,810	76	1	2.52	.920	1	0	1	34	4	0	7.15	.833
2012–13	Chicago Wolves	AHL	53	24	25	3	3,094	125	6	2.42	.921	—	—	—	—	—	—	—	—
2013–14	Chicago Wolves	AHL	23	11	10	2	1,417	67	0	2.84	.900	1	0	0	27	2	0	4.52	.867
2014–15	Chicago Wolves	AHL	37	15	14	3	2,021	83	2	2.46	.908	—	—	—	—	—	—	—	—
2015–16	Straubing Tigers	DEL	42	21	20	0	2,413	111	2	2.76	.913	7	3	4	417	18	0	2.59	.930
2016–17	Straubing Tigers	DEL	31	13	16	0	1,737	90	3	3.11	.908	2	0	2	162	5	0	1.85	.952
2017–18	HKm Zvolen	Slovak	11	—	—	—	671	29	0	2.59	.909	—	—	—	—	—	—	—	—
2017–18	HC Bolzano	EBEL	1	1	0	0	60	2	0	2.00	.923	—	—	—	—	—	—	—	—
2018–19	HC TWK Innsbruck	EBEL	3	0	3	0	156	16	0	6.15	.768	—	—	—	—	—	—	—	—
2018–19	Sheffield Steelers	EIHL	11	5	6	0	622	34	0	3.28	.896	—	—	—	—	—	—	—	—
2018–19	HDD Jesenice	AlpsHL	7	—	—	—	423	13	0	1.84	.920	11	—	—	—	—	—	1.31	.956
2019	CBR Brave	AIHL	21	20	0	1	1003	43	1	2.14	.914	1	0	1	50	6	0	6.00	.850
NHL totals			5	2	2	0	277	15	0	3.24	.892	—	—	—	—	—	—	—	—

== Awards and honours ==
Award	Year
MJAHL Young/Knickle Trophy (GAA)	2003–04
MJAHL Top goaltender	2003–04
MJAHL League MVP	2003–04
CJHL RBC Player of the Year	2003–04
All-CHA Rookie Team	2004–05
All-CHA Most Valuable Player in Tournament	2005
All-CHA First Team	2006–07
All-CHA Second Team	2007–08

Awards and achievements
Preceded by Jeff Van Nynatten	CHA Most Valuable Player in Tournament; 2005	Succeeded by Jean-Guy Gervais
