= Tom Serratore =

American ice hockey coach

Current position
- Title: Head coach
- Team: Bemidji State
- Conference: CCHA

Biographical details
- Born: May 14, 1964 (age 62); Coleraine, Minnesota, U.S.

Playing career
- 1982–1984: Mankato State
- 1985–1987: Bemidji State
- Position: Forward

Coaching career (HC unless noted)
- 1987–1991: Brainerd High School (asst.)
- 1991–1993: Henry Sibley High School
- 1993–1999: St. Cloud State (asst.)
- 1999–2001: Bemidji State (asst.)
- 2001–present: Bemidji State

Head coaching record
- Overall: 416–397–108 (.510)
- Tournaments: 3–5 (.375)

Accomplishments and honors

Championships
- 2004 CHA regular season champion 2005 CHA regular season champion 2005 CHA tournament champion 2006 CHA tournament champion 2008 CHA regular season champion 2009 CHA regular season champion 2009 CHA tournament champion 2010 CHA regular season champion 2017 WCHA regular season champion 2024 CCHA regular season champion

Awards
- 2004 CHA Coach of the Year; 2005 CHA Coach of the Year; 2008 CHA Coach of the Year; 2009 CHA Coach of the Year; 2010 CHA Coach of the Year; 2017 WCHA Coach of the Year; 2020 WCHA Coach of the Year; 2024 CCHA Coach of the Year

Tom Serratore is an American college ice hockey coach. He has coached the Bemidji State Beavers men's ice hockey team since the 2001–02 season, taking over from Bob Peters.

== Career ==
Serratore got his first taste of the college game as a player at Mankato State under Don Brose. He played two years for the Mavericks before transferring to Bemidji State to play for the powerhouse Beavers. Under the direction of Bob Peters Serratore arrived just in time to win a Division III National Title in 1986, following up his senior season as team captain.

With his playing career over, Serratore turned to coaching, serving first as an assistant at Brainerd High School, then becoming a head coach at Henry Sibley High School before receiving an opportunity at the collegiate level as an assistant at St. Cloud State in 1993–94. Serratore stayed with the Huskies under Craig Dahl for five seasons before returning to his alma mater just as Bemidji State was joining the Division I ranks. Serratore worked with his old coach for two seasons before Peters retired, allowing Serratore to take over for the legendary figure.

As head coach, Serratore quickly build the Beavers into a conference powerhouse, winning a regular season title in his third season and a conference title the following year. It took a little longer for Serratore to lead Bemidji State to an NCAA Tournament win, but when he got one he didn't stop there, pushing the Beavers into the 2009 Frozen Four. Though the team's record has declined a bit since joining the WCHA, Serratore remains firmly in place behind the bench.

== Personal life ==
Tom Serratore is the brother of Air Force head coach Frank Serratore and is the uncle to Frank's son Tom Serratore. Tom is also a cousin to Robb Stauber.

== Head coaching record ==
Record table
Season	Team	Overall	Conference	Standing	Postseason
Bemidji State Beavers (CHA) (2001–2010)
2001–02	Bemidji State	12–18–5	8–7–4	2nd	CHA semifinals
2002–03	Bemidji State	14–14–8	10–6–4	4th	CHA runner-up
2003–04	Bemidji State	20–13–3	16–3–1	1st	CHA runner-up
2004–05	Bemidji State	23–13–1	16–4–0	1st	NCAA Northeast Regional semifinals
2005–06	Bemidji State	20–14–3	12–7–1	t-2nd	NCAA Midwest Regional semifinals
2006–07	Bemidji State	14–14–5	9–6–5	2nd	CHA semifinals
2007–08	Bemidji State	17–16–3	13–4–3	1st	CHA runner-up
2008–09	Bemidji State	20–16–1	12–5–1	1st	NCAA Frozen Four
2009–10	Bemidji State	23–10–4	14–3–1	1st	NCAA Midwest Regional semifinals
Bemidji State:		163–128–33	110–45–20		
Bemidji State Beavers (WCHA) (2010–2021)
2010–11	Bemidji State	15–18–5	8–15–5	10th	WCHA semifinals
2011–12	Bemidji State	17–18–3	11–14–3	9th	WCHA first round
2012–13	Bemidji State	6–22–8	5–16–7	11th	WCHA first round
2013–14	Bemidji State	10–21–7	10–14–4	t-8th	WCHA quarterfinals
2014–15	Bemidji State	16–17–5	12–11–5	5th	WCHA first round
2015–16	Bemidji State	17–16–6	11–12–5	6th	WCHA first round
2016–17	Bemidji State	22–16–3	20–6–2	1st	WCHA semifinals
2017–18	Bemidji State	16–14–8	13–9–6	4th	WCHA first round
2018–19	Bemidji State	15–17–6	13–11–4	5th	WCHA first round
2019–20	Bemidji State	22–10–5	20–5–3–2	2nd	Tournament cancelled
2020–21	Bemidji State	16–10–3	8–5–1	4th	NCAA East Regional final
Bemidji State:		172–173–59	131–118–45		
Bemidji State Beavers (CCHA) (2021–present)
2021–22	Bemidji State	19–20–0	14–12–0	3rd	CCHA runner-up
2022–23	Bemidji State	14–17–5	12–11–3	T–4th	CCHA Quarterfinals
2023–24	Bemidji State	20–16–2	15–7–2	1st	CCHA Runner-Up
2024–25	Bemidji State	15–18–5	10–14–2	T–6th	CCHA Semifinals
2025–26	Bemidji State	13–19–4	11–11–4	6th	CCHA Quarterfinals
Bemidji State:		81–90–16	62–55–11		
Total:		416–397–108			
National champion Postseason invitational champion Conference regular season champion Conference regular season and conference tournament champion Division regular season champion Division regular season and conference tournament champion Conference tournament champion

== See also ==
- List of college men's ice hockey coaches with 400 wins

Awards and achievements
Preceded by Doug Ross; Dave Burkholder	CHA Coach of the Year; 2003–04, 2004–05; 2007–08, 2008–09, 2009–10	Succeeded by Dave Burkholder; Award Discontinued
Preceded by Mel Pearson; Mike Hastings	WCHA Coach of the Year; 2016–17; 2019–20	Succeeded by Grant Potulny; Mike Hastings
Preceded by Joe Shawhan	CCHA Coach of the Year; 2023–24	Succeeded by Luke Strand
