= Jerry Forton =

American ice hockey coach

- Born: Buffalo, New York, USA
- Occupation: Assistant Coach Buffalo Sabres

Jerry Forton is the Director of Amateur Scouting for the Buffalo Sabres, an ice hockey team of the National Hockey League (NHL).

Forton began his coaching career in 1996 as an assistant at Niagara University. After leaving Niagara in 2009, he worked two seasons as an assistant at the University of Massachusetts Lowell, before accepting a coaching position with Harvard University.

In August 2013, Forton was hired as an assistant coach by the Buffalo Sabres of the National Hockey League. In March of 2021, Forton became the Director of Amateur Scouting for the Sabres.
