= CHA Coach of the Year =

- Sport: Ice hockey
- Awarded for: The Coach of the Year in the CHA

History
- First award: 2000
- Final award: 2010
- Most recent: Tom Serratore

The CHA Coach of the Year was an annual award given out at the conclusion of the College Hockey America regular season to the best coach in the conference as voted by the coaches of each CHA team.

The Coach of the Year was first awarded in 2000 and every year thereafter until 2010 when the CHA was disbanded when they could no longer retain their automatic bid to the NCAA Tournament.

== Award winners ==
Year	Winner	School
1999–00	Blaise MacDonald	Niagara
2000–01	Craig Barnett	Findlay
2001–02	Bill Wilkinson	Wayne State
2002–03	Doug Ross	Alabama–Huntsville
2003–04	Tom Serratore	Bemidji State
2004–05	Tom Serratore	Bemidji State
2005–06	Dave Burkholder	Niagara
2006–07	Dave Burkholder	Niagara
2007–08	Tom Serratore	Bemidji State
2008–09	Tom Serratore	Bemidji State
2009–10	Tom Serratore	Bemidji State

=== Winners by school ===
School	Winners
Bemidji State	5
Niagara	3
Alabama–Huntsville	1
Findlay	1
Wayne State	1

== See also ==
- CHA Awards
