= CHA men's ice hockey tournament =

Collegiate ice hockey tournament (1999–2010)

CHA Men's Tournament (defunct)
- College hockey conference championship
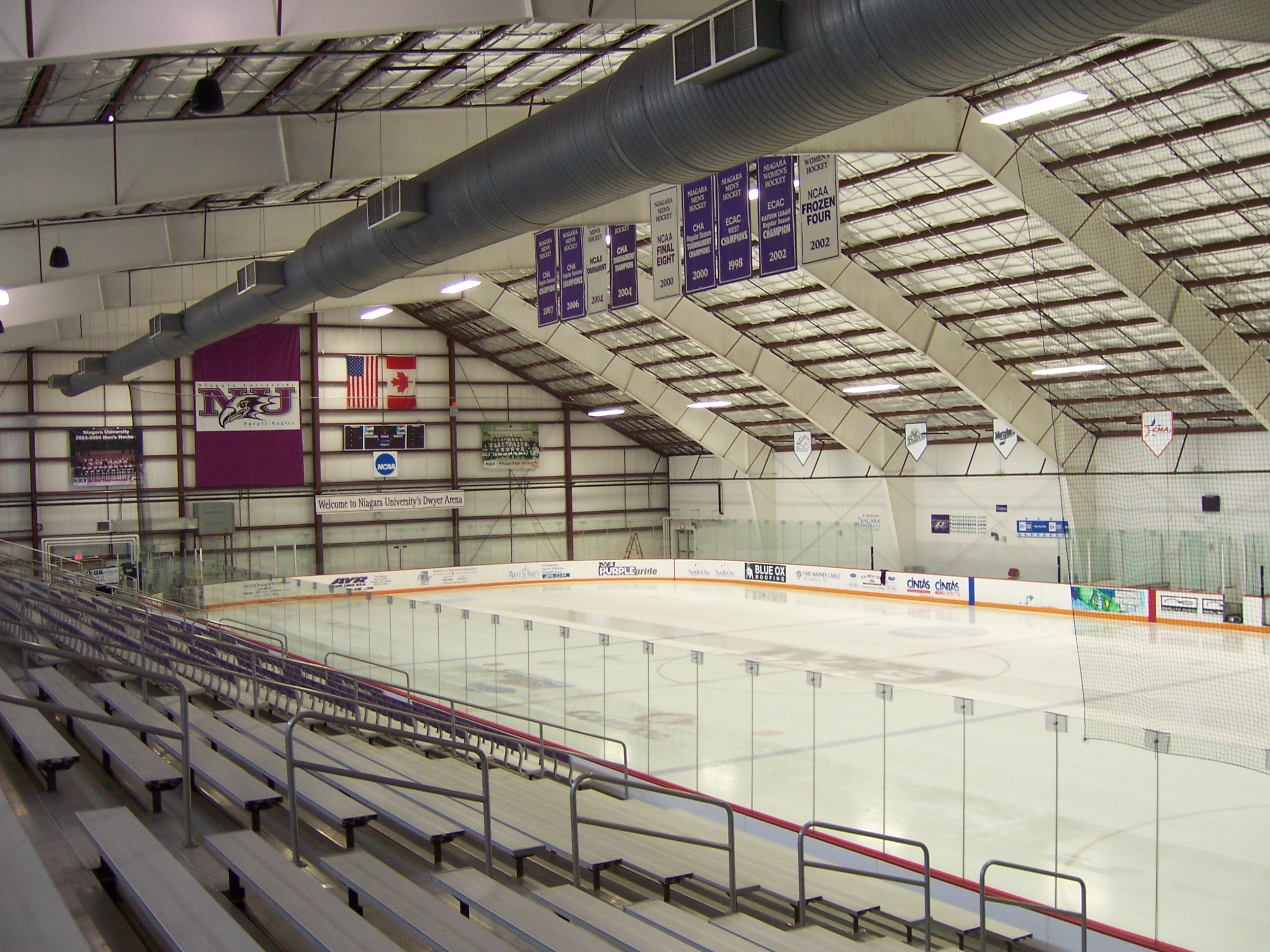
- Niagara's Dwyer Arena in Lewiston, New York hosted the tournament's championship game three times, the most of any venue.
- Sport: College ice hockey
- Conference: College Hockey America
- Number of teams: 4
- Format: Single-elimination
- Played: 2000–2010
- Last contest: 2010 CHA Tournament
- Current champion: Alabama–Huntsville (second win)
- Most championships: Bemidji State, Niagara, Wayne State (three wins)
- Winner trophy: Bruce M. McLeod Trophy

The College Hockey America Men's Tournament was the conference tournament for the men's division of College Hockey America (CHA), a former NCAA Division I men's ice hockey conference that operated from 1999–2010. The winner of the tournament received an automatic berth into the NCAA Tournament and the Bruce M. McLeod Trophy.

== History ==
College Hockey America (CHA) was a National Collegiate Athletic Association (NCAA) Division I ice hockey-only conference based in Detroit, Michigan that was formed in mid-1999 after the dissolution of Division II ice hockey. CHA was originally a men's and women's ice hockey conference, but became a women's-only conference after 2010, when Niagara and Robert Morris joined the Atlantic Hockey Association, Bemidji State joined the WCHA, and Alabama–Huntsville became an independent school. CHA continued to operate as a women-only league through the 2023–24 season, after which it merged with the men's Atlantic Hockey Association to form the current Atlantic Hockey America.

After the completion of each regular season, it held the CHA men's ice hockey tournament to determine its men's conference champion. In 2001, CHA commissioned the Bruce M. McLeod Trophy, named after its first commissioner, which was awarded to the tournament champion. In 2003, CHA was granted an annual automatic bid to the NCAA men's ice hockey championship for its tournament champion. Before this, the only CHA team to have played in the national championship tournament was Niagara, which received an at-large bid into the 2000 tournament. No CHA team won a national championship, and until 2009, Niagara was the only CHA team to have advanced past the first round. In the 2009 tournament, Bemidji State became the only CHA team and first 16th ranked seed to ever advance to the Frozen Four.

Eleven CHA men's ice hockey tournaments were held during the existence of CHA. The tournament was first hosted at the Von Braun Center in Huntsville, Alabama and was won by Niagara. Bemidji State, Niagara, and Wayne State won the most CHA Men's Ice Hockey Tournaments, with three each. Alabama–Huntsville and Bemidji State had the most championship game appearances, with six each. Bill Wilkinson and Tom Serratore coached three championship teams, more than any other CHA coaches. Tom Serratore had the most championship game appearances as a coach, with six. Dwyer Arena in Lewiston, New York hosted the tournament three times, more than any other venue.

== CHA men's tournament champions ==
Year	Winning team	Coach	Losing team	Coach	Score	Location	Venue	Reference
2000	Niagara	Blaise MacDonald	Alabama–Huntsville	Doug Ross	3–2	Huntsville, Alabama	Von Braun Center	
2001	Wayne State	Bill Wilkinson	Alabama–Huntsville	Doug Ross	4–1	Huntsville, Alabama	Von Braun Center	
2002	Wayne State	Bill Wilkinson	Alabama–Huntsville	Doug Ross	5–4 (OT)	Lewiston, New York	Dwyer Arena	
2003	Wayne State	Bill Wilkinson	Bemidji State	Tom Serratore	3–2	Kearney, Nebraska	Tri-City Arena	
2004	Niagara	Dave Burkholder	Bemidji State	Tom Serratore	4–3 (OT)	Kearney, Nebraska	Tri-City Arena	
2005	Bemidji State	Tom Serratore	Alabama–Huntsville	Doug Ross	3–0	Grand Rapids, Minnesota	IRA Civic Center	
2006	Bemidji State	Tom Serratore	Niagara	Dave Burkholder	4–2	Detroit, Michigan	Michigan State Fairgrounds Coliseum	
2007	Alabama–Huntsville	Doug Ross	Robert Morris	Derek Schooley	5–4 (OT)	Des Moines, Iowa	95KGGO Arena	
2008	Niagara	Dave Burkholder	Bemidji State	Tom Serratore	3–2	Lewiston, New York	Dwyer Arena	
2009	Bemidji State	Tom Serratore	Robert Morris	Derek Schooley	3–2 (OT)	Bemidji, Minnesota	John S. Glas Field House	
2010	Alabama–Huntsville	Danton Cole	Niagara	Dave Burkholder	3–2 (OT)	Lewiston, New York	Dwyer Arena	

== Championship Round Performance ==
School	Championships	Appearances	Pct.
Bemidji State	3	6	.500
Niagara	3	5	.600
Wayne State	3	3	1.000
Alabama–Huntsville	2	6	.333
Robert Morris	0	2	.000

== Location of CHA men's tournaments ==
- 2000–2001: Von Braun Center, Huntsville, Alabama
- 2002, 2008, 2010: Dwyer Arena, Lewiston, New York
- 2003–2004: Tri-City Arena, Kearney, Nebraska
- 2005: IRA Civic Center, Grand Rapids, Minnesota
- 2006: Michigan State Fairgrounds Coliseum, Detroit, Michigan
- 2007: 95KGGO Arena, Des Moines, Iowa
- 2009: John S. Glas Field House, Bemidji, Minnesota
