= Greg Gardner =

Canadian ice hockey player

- Born: November 21, 1975 (age 50) Mississauga, Ontario, Canada
- Height: 6 ft 0 in (183 cm)
- Weight: 183 lb (83 kg; 13 st 1 lb)
- Position: Goaltender
- Caught: Left
- Played for: Syracuse Crunch; Dayton Bombers; Mississippi Sea Wolves; Fischtown Pinguins
- Playing career: 2000–2006
- Coaching career

Current position
- Title: Assistant coach
- Team: St. Lawrence
- Conference: ECAC Hockey

Biographical details
- Education: Niagara University

Coaching career (HC unless noted)
- 2006–2011: Niagara (asst.)
- 2011–2014: Princeton (asst.)
- 2014–2025: Mercyhurst (asso.)
- 2025–present: St. Lawrence (asst.)
Medal record
Ice hockey
Representing Canada
Maccabiah Games
Gold medal – first place	1997 Israel	Ice hockey

Gregory Gardner (born November 21, 1975) is a Canadian ice hockey coach and former goaltender who is the NCAA Division I record-holder for shutouts in a season (as of 2021). He was the first ever player signed by the Columbus Blue Jackets.

== Career ==
When Niagara University began sponsoring men's ice hockey in 1996, they did so with Gardner as their primary goaltender. The team joined ECAC West for their inaugural season, one of the top conferences in Division III, and performed surprisingly well. Gardner helped the team finish second in the conference but, because the team was in its first season of play, they were ineligible for any postseason play. Both Gardner and the Eagles played even better in year two, with Niagara winning both the ECAC West regular season and Tournament Championships. While Gardner overall numbers were underwhelming, 12 of the team's 27 games had been played against Division I programs. Niagara had done this because the school's plan was to promote the program to Division I the following year.

He played for Team Canada in the 1997 Maccabiah Games in Israel, winning a gold medal.

Gardner got his first taste of D-I hockey in the fall of 1998 and showed that he belonged when he helped Niagara earn a weekend split against the defending NCAA champion, #2 Michigan. He continued to play steady in goal for Niagara, helping the team finish with a winning record. For his final season, Gardner's team became a founding member of College Hockey America and he responded with one of the most stunning seasons in NCAA history. Gardner was in goal for 41 of the team's 42 games and led the nation with 29 wins and a 1.53 goals against average. He also set the NCAA record with 12 shutouts on the season, bringing his career total up to 16. In a stretch of 15 games, beginning in late December, Gardner went 13–0–2 and helped earn Niagara its first ever national ranking. Despite the gaudy totals, Gardner's competition was perceived as weak and he was not named as an All-American. Regardless of the personal slight, Gardner helped the Purple Eagles win the inaugural CHA Tournament and put the team in prime position for an at-large bid.

Because the CHA was a new conference, they did not have an automatic bid into the NCAA Tournament despite having the requisite number of member teams (6). Even though the conssnsus at the time was that the conference was inferior to the other established leagues, the NCAA selection committee could not ignore Niagara's 29–7–4 record and awarded the final western seed to the Purple Eagles. Niagara faced New Hampshire in its first NCAA game and showed they belonged by winning the match. While the Eagles were outshout 18–35, Gardner turned away 34 attempts and led the team to a moderately surprising 4–1 win. While they could not replicate the performance in the second game, falling to the eventual national champions, Gardner had ensured his legacy with the program by giving the Purple Eagles their first (and only as of 2021) 30-win season.

After graduating, Gardner played several years of professional hockey, mostly in the ECHL. His best season came in 2003 when he helped the Mississippi Sea Wolves capture a division championship. Gardner retired as a player in 2006 and immediately returned to college hockey as a coach. He spent 5 seasons as an assistant with his alma mater before moving on to Princeton in 2011. he is currently the associate head coach at Mercyhurst.

Gardner was inducted into the Niagara Athletic Hall of Fame in 2006.

== Statistics ==
=== Regular season and playoffs ===
			Regular season									Playoffs
Season	Team	League	GP	W	L	T	MIN	GA	SO	GAA	SV%	GP	W	L	MIN	GA	SO	GAA	SV%
1992–93	Caledon Canadians	CJBHL	28	—	—	—	1390	73	1	3.15	—	—	—	—	—	—	—	—	—
1993–94	Caledon Canadians	MetJHL	1	1	0	0	40	5	0	7.50	—	—	—	—	—	—	—	—	—
1993–94	Thornhill Islanders	MetJHL	31	18	11	1	1813	103	1	3.41	—	—	—	—	—	—	—	—	—
1994–95	Thornhill Islanders	MetJHL	42	—	—	—	—	—	—	2.89	—	11	—	—	—	—	—	3.19	—
1995–96	Thornhill Islanders	MetJHL	34	—	—	—	2005	100	2	2.99	—	18	—	—	—	—	—	3.23	—
1996–97	Niagara	ECAC West	17	8	5	2	939	54	0	3.45	.875	—	—	—	—	—	—	—	—
1997–98	Niagara	ECAC West	25	12	10	3	1454	74	0	3.05	.875	—	—	—	—	—	—	—	—
1998–99	Niagara	Independent	30	15	10	3	1742	78	4	2.69	.912	—	—	—	—	—	—	—	—
1999–00	Niagara	CHA	41	29	8	4	2503	64	12	1.53	.936	—	—	—	—	—	—	—	—
2000–01	Syracuse Crunch	AHL	9	1	5	0	351	28	0	4.78	.859	—	—	—	—	—	—	—	—
2000–01	Dayton Bombers	ECHL	28	14	9	2	1600	70	2	2.62	.908	3	—	—	—	—	—	2.96	.894
2001–02	Dayton Bombers	ECHL	16	11	4	1	965	43	1	2.67	.903	—	—	—	—	—	—	—	—
2001–02	Syracuse Crunch	AHL	18	7	6	3	992	41	2	2.48	.923	1	—	—	—	—	—	—	—
2002–03	Mississippi Sea Wolves	ECHL	55	32	17	4	3141	145	0	2.77	.919	12	—	—	—	—	—	2.03	.941
2003–04	Mississippi Sea Wolves	ECHL	47	30	14	3	2789	113	3	2.43	.923	5	—	—	—	—	—	2.23	.935
2004–05	Fischtown Pinguins	Bundesliga	49	—	—	—	2859	114	4	2.43	—	5	—	—	—	—	—	3.27	—
2005–06	Fischtown Pinguins	Bundesliga	47	—	—	—	—	—	—	2.63	—	13	—	—	—	—	—	2.11	—
NCAA totals			113	64	33	12	6,638	270	16	2.44	.907	—	—	—	—	—	—	—	—
ECHL totals			146	87	44	10	8,495	371	6	2.62	.917	20	—	—	—	—	—	—	—
AHL totals			27	8	11	3	1,343	69	2	3.08	.905	1	—	—	—	—	—	—	—
Bundesliga totals			96	—	—	—	—	—	—	—	—	18	—	—	—	—	—	—	—

== Awards and honors ==
Award	Year
All-CHA First Team	1999–00

Awards and achievements
Preceded by First Awarded	CHA Player of the Year; 1999–00	Succeeded by Marc Kielkucki
