= Dave Burkholder =

Canadian ice hockey player and coach

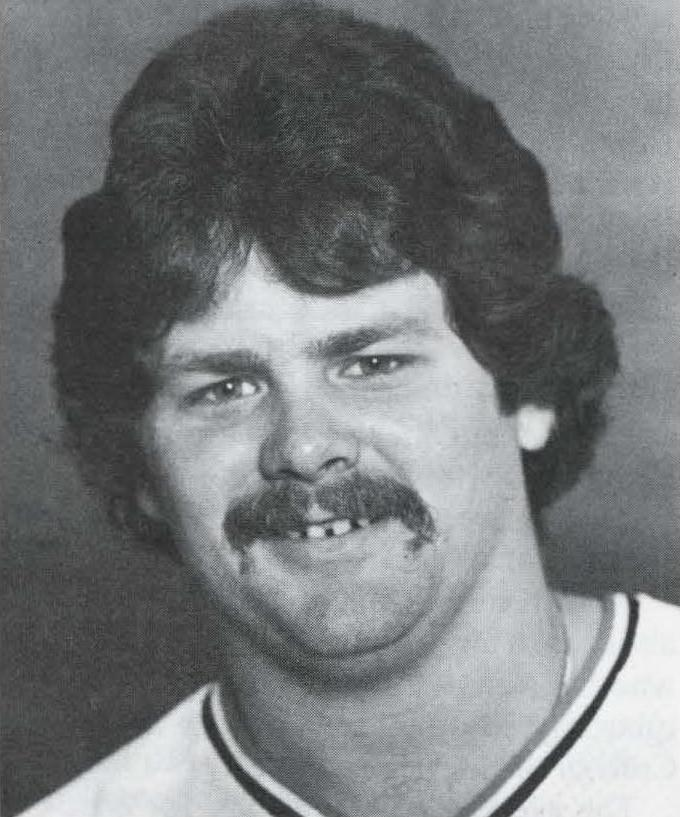
- Burkholder circa 1983

Biographical details
- Born: 1962 (age 63–64); Welland, Ontario, Canada
- Education: Rochester Institute of Technology

Playing career
- 1980–1984: RIT
- Position: Goaltender

Coaching career (HC unless noted)
- 1994–1996: Niagara Falls Thunder (assistant)
- 1996–2001: Niagara (assistant)
- 2001–2017: Niagara

Head coaching record
- Overall: 247–279–68 (.473)
- Tournaments: 0–3 (.000)

Accomplishments and honors

Championships
- 2004 CHA Tournament champion 2006 CHA Champion; 2007 CHA Champion; 2008 CHA tournament champion 2013 Atlantic Hockey Champion

Awards
- 2006 CHA Coach of the Year; 2007 CHA Coach of the Year; 2013 Atlantic Hockey Coach of the Year

Dave Burkholder (born 1962) is a Canadian college ice hockey coach and former college player. He coached the Niagara University program from 2001 to 2017, taking over from Blaise MacDonald, a former teammate of his with the RIT Tigers. Burkholder also previously served as the assistant general manager and assistant coach of the Niagara Falls Thunder of the Ontario Hockey League.

== Career ==
Burkholder played college ice hockey as a goaltender with the RIT Tigers, winning the 1983 Division II National Championship.

Burkholder entered the coaching ranks in 1994 as an assistant coach and assistant GM for the Niagara Falls Thunder. Two years later he accepted an assistant coaching role with the newly created Niagara program. Burkholder remained in that position until he was named as the head coach following Blaise MacDonald leaving to take over at Massachusetts–Lowell.

Burkholder built in the success that his former teammate started, winning two conference tournaments, a pair of league title and consistently finishing near the top of the CHA standings over the next nine seasons. Once the CHA folded Niagara joined Atlantic Hockey in 2010–11. Burkholder's team played well the first several seasons, including a league title in his third year, but afterwards the program fell on hard times. For three straight years the team finished with only single-digit win totals and it was announced in the spring of 2017 that Niagara would not be bringing Burkholder back.

== Head coaching record ==
Record table
Season	Team	Overall	Conference	Standing	Postseason
Niagara Purple Eagles (CHA) (2001–2010)
2001–02	Niagara	17–17–1	8–10–1	4th	CHA Quarterfinals
2002–03	Niagara	15–17–5	11–4–5	2nd	CHA Semifinals
2003–04	Niagara	21–15–3	14–6–0	2nd	NCAA Northeast regional semifinals
2004–05	Niagara	15–19–2	9–9–2	3rd	CHA Semifinals
2005–06	Niagara	20–15–1	13–6–1	1st	CHA runner-up
2006–07	Niagara	18–13–6	9–5–6	1st	CHA Semifinals
2007–08	Niagara	22–11–4	12–6–2	2nd	NCAA East regional semifinals
2008–09	Niagara	16–14–6	9–5–4	2nd	CHA third-place game (Tie)
2009–10	Niagara	12–20–4	6–10–2	t-3rd	CHA runner-up
Niagara:		156–141–32	91–61–23		
Niagara Purple Eagles (Atlantic Hockey) (2010–2017)
2010–11	Niagara	18–13–4	15–10–2	4th	Atlantic Hockey first round
2011–12	Niagara	17–11–9	14–6–7	2nd	Atlantic Hockey Semifinals
2012–13	Niagara	23–10–5	20–5–2	1st	NCAA West regional semifinals
2013–14	Niagara	15–20–5	11–11–5	6th	Atlantic Hockey Semifinals
2014–15	Niagara	7–28–4	5–19–4	11th	Atlantic Hockey Quarterfinals
2015–16	Niagara	6–25–6	5–18–5	t-10th	Atlantic Hockey first round
2016–17	Niagara	5–31–3	3–23–2	11th	Atlantic Hockey Quarterfinals
Niagara:		91–138–36	73–92–27		
Total:		247–279–68			
National champion Postseason invitational champion Conference regular season champion Conference regular season and conference tournament champion Division regular season champion Division regular season and conference tournament champion Conference tournament champion

Awards and achievements
Preceded by Paul Lohnes	NCAA Tournament Most Outstanding Player; 1983	Succeeded by Joel Otto
Preceded by Tom Serratore	CHA Coach of the Year; 2005–06, 2006–07	Succeeded by Tom Serratore
Preceded by Ryan Soderquist	Atlantic Hockey Coach of the Year; 2012–13	Succeeded by Rick Gotkin
