= Blaise MacDonald =

American ice hockey coach

Current position
- Title: Head coach
- Team: Colby College
- Conference: New England Small College Athletic Conference

Biographical details
- Born: Billerica, Massachusetts, U.S.
- Education: Rochester Institute of Technology

Playing career
- 1981–1985: RIT
- Position: Defenceman

Coaching career (HC unless noted)
- 1985–1987: Dartmouth (assistant)
- 1987–1988: Princeton (assistant)
- 1988–1990: Massachusetts–Lowell (assistant)
- 1990–1996: Boston University (assistant)
- 1996–2001: Niagara
- 2001–2011: Massachusetts–Lowell
- 2011–2012: Massachusetts (assistant)
- 2012–present: Colby

Head coaching record
- Overall: 321–324–87 (.498)
- Tournaments: 3–2 (.600)

Accomplishments and honors

Championships
- 2000 CHA Champion; 2000 CHA Tournament champion 2018 NESCAC tournament champion

Awards
- 2000 CHA Coach of the Year; 2018 Edward Jeremiah Award

Blaise MacDonald is an American college ice hockey coach currently heading the men's team at Colby College.

== Career ==
Previously he was an assistant coach at Dartmouth (1986–87), Princeton (1987–88), UMass Lowell (1988–90) and Boston University (1991–96), and a head coach at Niagara (1996–2001), where he compiled an all-time record of 91–58–17 and UMass Lowell (2001–11) with an overall record of 150–178–44.

== Head coaching record ==
Record table
Season	Team	Overall	Conference	Standing	Postseason
Niagara Purple Eagles (ECAC West) (1996–1998)
1996–97	Niagara	16–9–2	6–2–2	2nd	Ineligible
1997–98	Niagara	14–10–3	8–1–1	1st	ECAC West Champion
Niagara:		30–19–5	14–3–3		
Niagara Purple Eagles Independent (1998–1999)
1998–99	Niagara	17–12–3			
Niagara:		17–12–3			
Niagara Purple Eagles (CHA) (1999–2001)
1999–00	Niagara	30–8–4	15–0–2	1st	NCAA West Regional semifinals
2000–01	Niagara	14–19–5	10–7–3	2nd	CHA consolation game (Tie)
Niagara:		44–27–9	25–7–5		
Massachusetts–Lowell River Hawks (Hockey East) (2001–2011)
2001–02	Massachusetts–Lowell	22–13–3	12–9–3	4th	Hockey East Semifinals
2002–03	Massachusetts–Lowell	11–20–5	4–16–4	t-8th	Hockey East Quarterfinals
2003–04	Massachusetts–Lowell	15–18–7	7–12–5	6th	Hockey East Quarterfinals
2004–05	Massachusetts–Lowell	20–12–4	11–10–3	5th	Hockey East Quarterfinals
2005–06	Massachusetts–Lowell	14–20–2	11–14–2	7th	Hockey East Quarterfinals
2006–07	Massachusetts–Lowell	8–21–7	7–16–4	9th	
2007–08	Massachusetts–Lowell	16–17–4	10–13–4	7th	Hockey East Quarterfinals
2008–09	Massachusetts–Lowell	20–16–2	14–11–2	5th	Hockey East runner-up
2009–10	Massachusetts–Lowell	19–16–4	12–11–4	t-3rd	Hockey East Quarterfinals
2010–11	Massachusetts–Lowell	5–25–4	4–21–2	10th	
Massachusetts–Lowell:		150–178–42	92–133–33		
Colby Mules (NESCAC) (2012–present)
2012–13	Colby	7–15–3	5–11–2	7th	NESCAC quarterfinals
2013–14	Colby	11–11–3	8–9–1	t-6th	NESCAC quarterfinals
2014–15	Colby	5–16–3	2–13–3	9th	
2015–16	Colby	9–11–5	6–9–3	t-7th	NESCAC quarterfinals
2016–17	Colby	13–7–4	11–4–3	2nd	NESCAC quarterfinals
2017–18	Colby	17–11–2	9–7–2	T–5th	NCAA Frozen Four
2018–19	Colby	10–10–5	7–7–4	6th	NESCAC quarterfinals
2019–20	Colby	7–14–3	3–13–2	10th	
2020–21	Colby	1–3–0	—	N/A	
Colby:		80–88–28	51–73–20		
Total:		321–324–87			
National champion Postseason invitational champion Conference regular season champion Conference regular season and conference tournament champion Division regular season champion Division regular season and conference tournament champion Conference tournament champion

Awards and achievements
Preceded by Award Created	CHA Coach of the Year; 1999–00	Succeeded by Craig Barnett
Preceded by Mike McShane	Edward Jeremiah Award; 2017–18	Succeeded by Tyler Krueger
