= 2000 CHA men's ice hockey tournament =

2000 CHA Men's ice hockey tournament
- Dates: March 10–12, 2000
- Teams: 5
- Finals site: Von Braun Center; Huntsville, Alabama
- Champions: Niagara (1st title)
- Winning coach: Blaise MacDonald (1st title)
- MVP: Kyle Martin (Niagara)
- CHA Men's Ice Hockey Tournaments

The 2000 CHA Men's Ice Hockey Tournament (also known as the 2000 CHA Final Five) was the 1st tournament in conference history and was played between March 10 and March 12, 2000, at the Von Braun Center in Huntsville, Alabama. Niagara defeated Alabama-Huntsville 3–2 in the championship game to win the inaugural tournament.

== Format ==
The tournament featured three rounds of play. The top five teams in the regular season conference standings advanced to the tournament. In the first round, the fourth and fifth ranked seeds, Air Force and Findlay, played for entry into the semifinals, to which the top three seeds received byes. The winners of the two semifinal games then played for the championship on March 12, 2000.

=== Conference standings ===
Note: GP = Games played; W = Wins; L = Losses; T = Ties; PTS = Points; GF = Goals For; GA = Goals Against

1999–2000 College Hockey America standings
	Conference							Overall					
	GP	W	L	T	PTS	GF	GA	GP	W	L	T	GF	GA
#13 Niagara†*	17	15	0	2	32	86	18	42	30	8	4	165	65
Alabama–Huntsville	18	12	5	1	25	73	46	31	17	10	4	121	86
Bemidji State	17	8	8	1	17	63	69	34	13	20	1	107	155
Air Force	16	6	10	0	12	44	50	39	19	18	2	131	125
Findlay	18	4	14	0	8	38	101	31	9	22	0	79	146
Army	10	1	9	0	2	21	41	33	13	18	2	102	98
Championship: Niagara † indicates conference regular season champion * indicates conference tournament champion Final rankings: USA Today/USA Hockey Magazine Top 15 Poll

== Bracket ==
Quarterfinal; March 10, 2000
4	Air Force	4
5	Findlay	1

Semifinals; March 11, 2000
1	Niagara	9
4	Air Force	1
2	Alabama-Huntsville	10
3	Bemidji State	4

Championship; March 12, 2000
1	Niagara	3
2	Alabama-Huntsville	2
Third place
3	Bemidji State	5*
4	Air Force	4

Note: * denotes overtime period(s)

=== Quarterfinal ===
==== (4) Air Force vs. (5) Findlay ====
March 10	Air Force	4 – 1	Findlay	Von Braun Center

=== Semifinals ===
==== (1) Niagara vs. (4) Air Force ====
March 11	Niagara	9 – 1	Air Force	Von Braun Center

==== (2) Alabama-Huntsville vs. (3) Bemidji State ====
March 11	Alabama-Huntsville	10 – 4	Bemidji State	Von Braun Center

=== Third Place Game ===
==== (3) Bemidji State vs. (4) Air Force ====
March 12	Bemidji State	5 – 4	OT	Air Force	Von Braun Center

=== Championship ===
==== (1) Niagara vs. (2) Alabama-Huntsville ====
March 12	Niagara	3 – 2	Alabama-Huntsville	Von Braun Center

== Tournament awards ==
=== All-Star team ===
- Goaltender: Greg Gardner (Niagara)
- Defensemen: Chris MacKenzie (Niagara), Shane Stewart (Alabama-Huntsville)
- Forwards: Nathan Bowen (Alabama-Huntsville), Jay Kasparek (Niagara), Kyle Martin (Niagara)

=== MVP ===
- Kyle Martin (Niagara)
