= Dwyer Arena =

Sports venue in Lewiston, New York

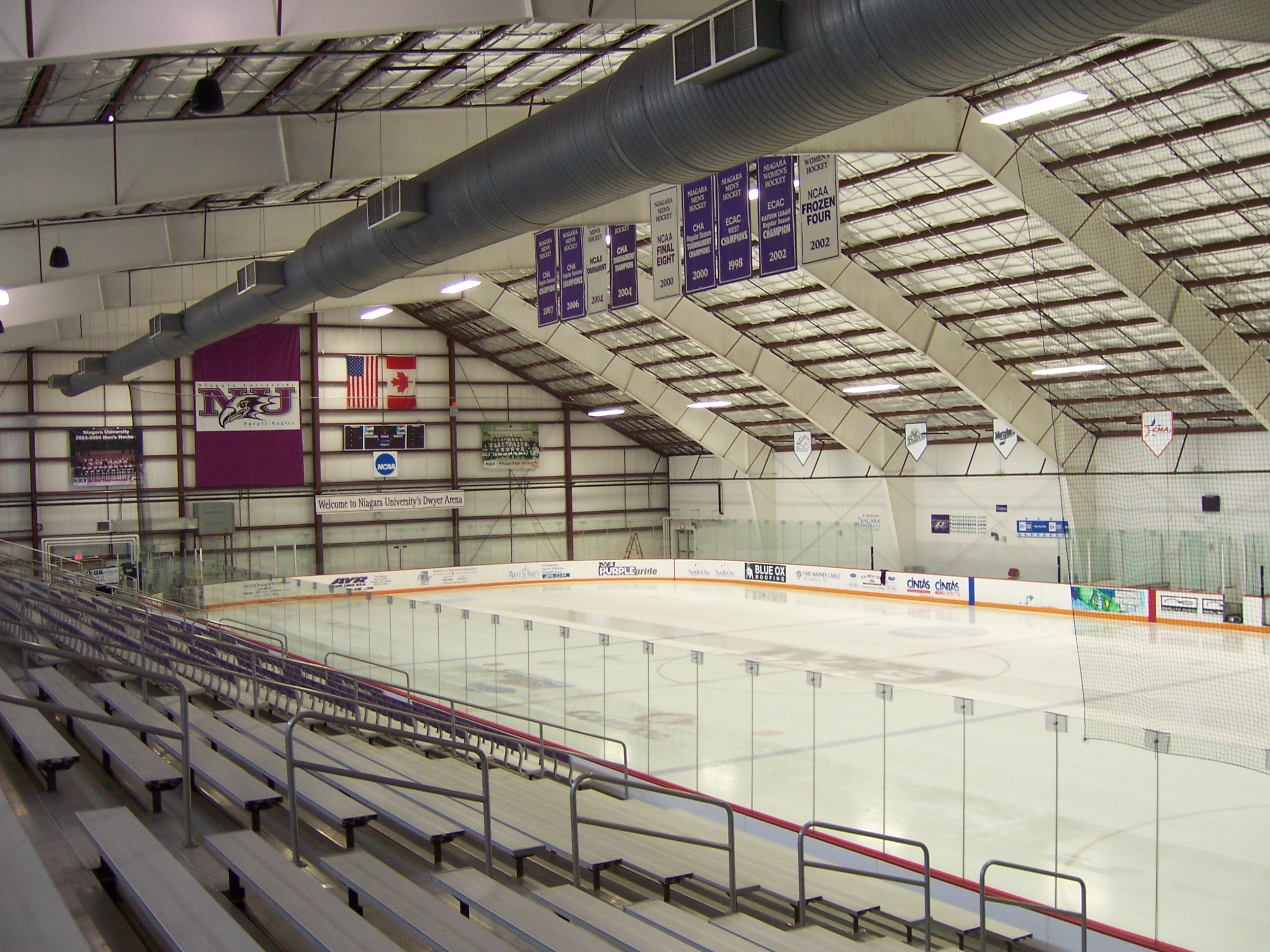
- Interactive map of Dwyer Arena
- Location: Niagara University; University Drive; Lewiston, New York 14109
- Coordinates: 43°8′6″N 79°2′4″W
- Owner: Niagara University
- Operator: Niagara University
- Capacity: 1,400
- Surface: 200' x 85' (hockey)

Construction
- Opened: May 10, 1996
- Cost: $6 million

Tenant
- Niagara Purple Eagles men's ice hockey

The Robert and Concetta Dwyer Arena is a 1,400-seat arena located on the Niagara University campus in Lewiston, New York, United States. The arena contains two rinks: a practice rink and a main rink which is home to the Niagara Purple Eagles men's ice hockey team, which plays in the Atlantic Hockey America, as well as the Niagara Junior Purple Eagles youth hockey team. The arena was formerly home to the women's ice hockey team, which played in College Hockey America.

The building was built in 1996. Prior to the 1999–2000 season, a major renovation took place as a result of a gift by Bob and Connie Dwyer, both 1965 graduates, who contributed $3 million for facilities upgrades. Locker and training rooms, players' lounge, and lobby were upgraded, while separate entrances for the main and auxiliary rinks, new pro shop, and new ticket office were added.

It hosted the College Hockey America 2002, 2008, and 2010 men's conference tournaments and the 2004 and 2008 women's conference tournaments. Dwyer was home of the Buffalo Sabres Summer Development Camp in 2008, 2009, 2010 and 2011. The arena co-hosted the 2011 World Junior Ice Hockey Championships.
