= 2008 CHA men's ice hockey tournament =

2008 CHA Men's ice hockey tournament
- 2008 CHA Men's Ice Hockey Tournament logo
- Dates: March 14–16, 2008
- Teams: 5
- Finals site: Dwyer Arena; Lewiston, New York
- Champions: Niagara (3rd title)
- Winning coach: Dave Burkholder (2nd title)
- MVP: Ted Cook (Niagara)
- CHA Men's Ice Hockey Tournaments

The 2008 CHA Men's Ice Hockey Tournament was the 9th tournament in conference history and was played between March 14 and March 16, 2008 at Dwyer Arena in Lewiston, New York. By winning the tournament, Niagara received College Hockey America's automatic bid to the 2008 NCAA Division I Men's Ice Hockey Tournament.

== Format ==
The tournament featured three rounds of play. In the first round, the fourth and fifth ranked seeds, Wayne State and Alabama-Huntsville, played for entry into the semifinals, to which the top three seeds received byes. The winners of the two semifinal games then played for the championship on March 16, 2008, with the winner receiving an automatic bid to the 2008 NCAA Division I Men's Ice Hockey Tournament.

=== Conference standings ===
Note: GP = Games played; W = Wins; L = Losses; T = Ties; PTS = Points; GF = Goals For; GA = Goals Against

2007–08 College Hockey America standings
	Conference							Overall					
	GP	W	L	T	PTS	GF	GA	GP	W	L	T	GF	GA
Bemidji State†	20	13	4	3	29	71	39	36	17	16	3	102	82
Niagara*	20	12	6	2	26	71	51	37	22	11	4	128	98
Robert Morris	20	10	7	3	23	67	67	34	15	15	4	114	127
Wayne State	20	6	14	0	12	54	71	38	11	25	2	90	132
Alabama–Huntsville	20	3	13	4	10	40	75	31	6	21	4	60	117
Championship: Niagara † indicates conference regular season champion * indicates conference tournament champion Final rankings: USA Today/USA Hockey Magazine Top 15 Poll

== Bracket ==
Quarterfinal; March 14, 2008
4	Wayne State	4
5	Alabama-Huntsville	0

Semifinals; March 15, 2008
1	Bemidji State	4
4	Wayne State	1
2	Niagara	6
3	Robert Morris	3

Championship; March 16, 2008
1	Bemidji State	2
2	Niagara	3

=== Quarterfinal ===
==== (4) Wayne State vs. (5) Alabama-Huntsville ====
March 14	Wayne State	4 – 0	Alabama-Huntsville	Dwyer Arena	Recap
Brock Meadows - 11:40		First period	No scoring
Stavros Paskaris - pp - 08:47; Mike Forgie - 14:22		Second period	No scoring
Dylan Exton - 04:34		Third period	No scoring
Brett Bothwell ( 21 saves / 21 shots )		Goalie stats	Blake MacNicol ( 25 saves / 29 shots )

=== Semifinals ===
==== (1) Bemidji State vs. (4) Wayne State ====
March 15	Bemidji State	4 – 1	Wayne State	Dwyer Arena	Recap
Matt Pope - pp - 04:00; Cody Bostock - pp - 16:26		First period	No scoring
Matt Read - 05:19		Second period	12:13 - Chris Kushneriuk
Tyler Scofield - en pp - 19:28		Third period	No scoring
Matt Climie ( 10 saves / 11 shots )		Goalie stats	Brett Bothwell ( 26 saves / 29 shots )

==== (2) Niagara vs. (3) Robert Morris ====
March 15	Niagara	6 – 3	Robert Morris	Dwyer Arena	Recap
No Scoring		First period	16:57 - Chris Margott
David Ross - 05:36; Dan Sullivan - 17:42		Second period	16:59 - Chris Margott
Ted Cook - 01:21; Egor Mironov - pp - 10:29; Egor Mironov - 12:44; Matt Caruana - en - 19:02		Third period	07:39 - pp - Chris Margott
Juliano Pagliero ( 34 saves / 37 shots )		Goalie stats	Christian Boucher ( 22 saves / 27 shots )

=== Championship ===
==== (1) Bemidji State vs. (2) Niagara ====
March 16	Bemidji State	2 – 3	Niagara	Dwyer Arena	Recap
Brandon Marino - pp - 02:55		First period	10:19 - pp - Ted Cook
Tyler Lehrke - 12:33		Second period	16:28 - Chris Moran; 19:15 - pp - Kyle Rogers
No scoring		Third period	No scoring
Matt Climie ( 22 saves / 25 shots )		Goalie stats	Juliano Pagliero ( 27 saves / 29 shots )

== Tournament awards ==
=== All-Star team ===
- Goaltender: Juliano Pagliero (Niagara)
- Defensemen: Cody Bostock (Bemidji State), Dan Sullivan (Niagara)
- Forwards: Chris Margott (Robert Morris), Kyle Rogers (Niagara), Tyler Scofield (Bemidji State)

=== MVP ===
- Ted Cook (Niagara)
