= 2004 CHA men's ice hockey tournament =

2004 CHA Men's ice hockey tournament
- Dates: March 12–14, 2004
- Teams: 6
- Finals site: Tri-City Arena; Kearney, Nebraska
- Champions: Niagara (2nd title)
- Winning coach: Dave Burkholder (1st title)
- MVP: Jeff Van Nynatten (Niagara)
- CHA Men's Ice Hockey Tournaments

The 2004 CHA Men's Ice Hockey Tournament was the 5th tournament in conference history and was played between March 12 and March 14, 2004 at Tri-City Arena in Kearney, Nebraska. By winning the tournament, Niagara received College Hockey America's automatic bid to the 2004 NCAA Division I Men's Ice Hockey Tournament.

== Format ==
The tournament featured six teams. The top two teams from the regular season received byes to the semifinals where they played the winners from the quarterfinal games. The two semifinal winners met in the championship game on March 14, 2004, with the winner receiving an automatic bid to the 2004 NCAA Division I Men's Ice Hockey Tournament.

=== Conference standings ===
Note: GP = Games played; W = Wins; L = Losses; T = Ties; PTS = Points; GF = Goals For; GA = Goals Against

2003–04 College Hockey America standings
	Conference							Overall					
	GP	W	L	T	PTS	GF	GA	GP	W	L	T	GF	GA
Bemidji State†	20	16	3	1	33	90	48	36	20	13	3	131	94
Niagara*	20	14	6	0	28	72	52	39	21	15	3	124	120
Alabama–Huntsville	20	10	9	1	21	65	60	31	11	16	4	92	94
Findlay	20	7	11	2	16	58	60	38	11	22	5	95	114
Air Force	20	6	13	1	13	49	78	37	14	21	2	101	131
Wayne State	20	4	15	1	9	44	80	36	9	24	3	83	144
Championship: Niagara † indicates conference regular season champion * indicates conference tournament champion Final rankings: USA Today/USA Hockey Magazine Top 15 Poll

== Bracket ==
Quarterfinal

March 12, 2004

Semifinals

March 13, 2004

Championship

March 14, 2004

1
Bemidji State
6

4
Findlay
9

4
Findlay
2

5
Air Force
1

1
Bemidji State
3

2
Niagara
4*

2
Niagara
2

3
Alabama-Huntsville
3

6
Wayne State
1

6
Wayne State
5

Note: * denotes overtime period(s)

== Tournament awards ==
=== All-Star team ===
- Goaltender: Matt Kelly (Wayne State)
- Defensemen: John Haider (Bemidji State), Andrew Lackner (Niagara)
- Forwards: Aaron Clarke (Niagara), Billy Collins (Wayne State), Kris Wiebe (Findlay)

=== MVP ===
- Jeff Van Nynatten (Niagara)
