= Wayne State Warriors men's ice hockey =

- University: Wayne State University
- Conference: CHA
- Arena: City Sports Ice Arena; Detroit, Michigan
- Colors: Green and gold

NCAA tournament appearances
- 2003

Conference tournament champions
- CHA: 2001, 2002, 2003

Conference regular season champions
- CHA: 2002

The Wayne State Warriors men's ice hockey team competed in NCAA's Division I in the College Hockey America (CHA) conference representing Wayne State University. The university dropped their men's program at the end of the 2007–08 season.

== Program History ==
Wayne State University began its men's ice hockey program in 1999, one of several programs to begin at or promote their programs to Division I ice hockey in the late 1990s. Before their first season the Warriors signed Bill Wilkinson as their first coach, hoping that his 20-year track record at Western Michigan would help bring in recruits and build the program quickly.

After a year as an Independent, Wayne State was invited to join College Hockey America, a conference made entirely of newly D-I programs. The Warriors were able to perform very well in the first few years, winning a conference championship, three consecutive conference tournaments and earning a bid to the 2003 NCAA Tournament (the first CHA automatic bid).

The most glaring problem with the ice hockey program at Wayne State was the university's lack of an on-campus ice rink. As a result, the team was forced to rent out space in various buildings over its existence. This combined with the Warriors inability to play other regional teams led to waning interest in the program despite being located in the hockey-friendly city of Detroit.

With the program losing money every year and the CCHA not looking to increase its membership beyond 12 teams, Wayne State decided to end its program after the 2007–08 season.

Four years after its dissolution, ice hockey returned to Wayne State as a club sport.

== Season-by-season results ==
Note: GP = Games played, W = Wins, L = Losses, T = Ties

NCAA D-I Champions	NCAA Frozen Four	Conference regular season champions	Conference Playoff Champions

Season	Conference	Regular season (Note: Code explanation; GP—Games Played, W—Wins, L—Losses, T—Tied games, Pts—Points)											Conference Tournament Results	National Tournament Results
Season	Conference	Conference						Overall					Conference Tournament Results	National Tournament Results
Season	Conference	GP	W	L	T	Pts	Finish	GP	W	L	T	%	Conference Tournament Results	National Tournament Results
Bill Wilkinson (1999–2008)
1999–00	Independent	–	–	–	–	–	–	30	12	16	2	.433		
2000–01	CHA	20	8	9	3	19	3rd	35	18	14	3	.557	Won Semifinal, 3–2 (OT) (Niagara); Won Championship, 4–1 (Alabama–Huntsville)	
2001–02	CHA	20	15	2	3	33	1st	36	21	11	4	.639	Won Semifinal, 3–1 (Air Force); Won Championship, 5–4 (OT) (Alabama–Huntsville)	
2002–03	CHA	20	11	7	2	24	T–3rd	40	21	17	2	.550	Won Quarterfinal, 4–2 (Air Force); Won Semifinal, 6–4 (Niagara); Won Championship, 3–2 (Bemidji State)	Lost Regional semifinal, 2–4 (Colorado College)
2003–04	CHA	20	4	15	1	9	6th	36	9	24	3	.292	Won Quarterfinal, 5–3 (Alabama–Huntsville); Lost Semifinal, 1–2 (Niagara)	
2004–05	CHA	20	7	9	4	18	4th	35	14	17	4	.457	Lost Quarterfinal, 3–4 (OT) (Air Force)	
2005–06	CHA	20	3	12	5	11	6th	35	6	23	6	.257	Lost Semifinal, 1–3 (Alabama–Huntsville)	
2006–07	CHA	20	8	10	2	16	4th	35	12	21	2	.371	Lost Quarterfinal, 3–4 (OT) (Alabama–Huntsville)	
2007–08	CHA	20	6	14	0	12	4th	38	11	25	2	.316	Won Quarterfinal, 4–0 (Alabama–Huntsville); Lost Semifinal, 1–4 (Bemidji State)	
Totals								GP	W	L	T	%	Championships	
Regular season								305	115	162	28	.423	1 CHA Championship	
Conference Post-season								14	9	5	0	.643	3 CHA tournament championships	
NCAA Post-season								1	0	1	0	.000	1 NCAA Tournament appearance	
Regular season and Post-season Record								320	124	168	28	.431		

== Notable players ==
- Jeff Caister
- Adam Krug
- Stavros Paskaris
- Keith Stanich

== See also ==
- Wayne State Warriors women's ice hockey
