= Niagara Purple Eagles men's ice hockey =

- Current season
- University: Niagara University
- Conference: AHA
- Head coach: Jason Lammers; 10th season, 126–168–28 (.435)
- Assistant coaches: Mark Phalon; Nate Skidmore
- Arena: Dwyer Arena; Lewiston, New York
- Colors: Purple and white

NCAA tournament appearances
- 2000, 2004, 2008, 2013

Conference tournament champions
- ECAC West: 1998; CHA: 2000, 2004, 2008

Conference regular season champions
- ECAC West: 1998; CHA: 2000, 2006, 2007; AHA: 2013

The Niagara Purple Eagles men's ice hockey team is a National Collegiate Athletic Association (NCAA) Division I college ice hockey program that represents Niagara University. The Purple Eagles are members of Atlantic Hockey America. They play at the Dwyer Arena in Lewiston, New York.

== History ==
After several years of playing at the club level, the team turned varsity in the 1996–97 season, which they played as independent.

In 1999 they became charter members of College Hockey America (CHA), joining two other independent teams (Air Force and Army) and three former Division II teams (Alabama–Huntsville, Bemidji State and Findlay).

Niagara went undefeated in conference play that season, 1999–00, winning the conference tournament and gaining an at-large invitation to the NCAA tournament, as the conference did not gain an automatic bid until the 2003 tournament. Starting goaltender Greg Gardner set a single-season NCAA record for shutouts with 12 as Niagara posted its first (and only as of 2019) 30-win campaign. The Purple Eagles upset the University of New Hampshire to advance to the Elite Eight, where they lost to North Dakota. North Dakota went on to win that national championship.

Niagara also won the College Hockey America Championship in 2004 and 2008, appearing in the NCAA Men's Ice Hockey Championship again those years. In 2004 they lost against Boston College and in 2008 against Michigan.

On January 29, 2009, Niagara University announced that the team was moving to the Atlantic Hockey Association beginning in the 2010-11 season, following the closure of CHA's men's division. CHA would continue to operate as a women-only conference for the next 14 years.

On October 14, 2010, it was announced that Jay McKee would serve as a volunteer assistant coach for Niagara Purple Eagles men's ice hockey, while not ruling out a return to the NHL.

On December 14, 2013 the Purple Eagles faced off against the RIT Tigers in an outdoor hockey game known as Frozen Frontier tying 2-2.

Shortly after the 2023–24 season, the Atlantic Hockey Association and CHA, which had shared a commissioner and conference staff since 2010, merged under the banner of Atlantic Hockey America.

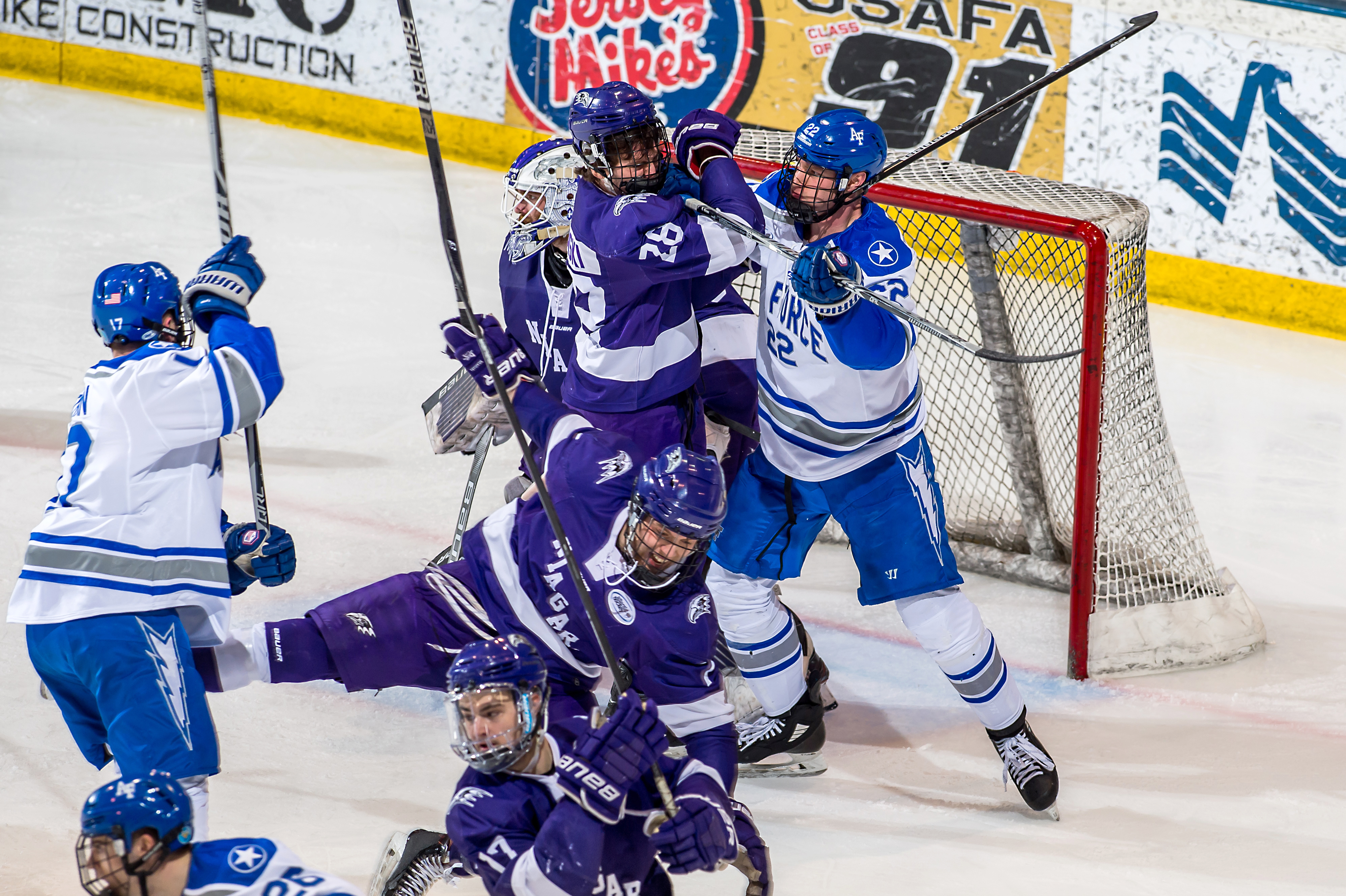
The Niagara men's ice hockey team plays against Air Force in 2019

== Season-by-season results ==
Source:

== Head coaches ==
As of the completion of 2025–26 season

Tenure	Coach	Years	Record	Pct.
1996–2001	Blaise MacDonald	5	91–58–17	.599
2001–2017	Dave Burkholder	16	247–279–68	.473
2017–Present	Jason Lammers	9	126–168–28	.435
Totals	3 coaches	30 seasons	464–505–113	.481

== NCAA tournament appearances ==
Year	Location	Opponent	Result
2000	Target Center	New Hampshire	W 4-1
2000	Target Center	North Dakota	L 1-4
2004	Verizon Wireless Arena	Boston College	L 2-5
2008	Times Union Center	Michigan	L 1-5
2013	Van Andel Arena	North Dakota	L 1-2

== Statistical leaders ==
=== Career points leaders ===
Player	Years	GP	G	A	Pts	PIM
Barret Ehgoetz	2001–2005	141	71	95	166	142
Mikko Sivonen	1996–2000	126	65	77	142	80
Michael Isherwood	1996–2000	126	55	87	142	112
Chris Moran	2006–2010	146	38	103	141	103
Ted Cook	2005–2009	139	78	59	137	226
Peter DeSantis	1996–2000	126	67	66	133	46
Sean Bentivoglio	2003–2007	145	43	89	132	142
Kyle Martin	1996–2000	124	60	69	129	58
Matt Caruana	2004–2008	146	51	78	129	108
Joe Tallari	2000–2004	144	60	64	124	111

=== Career goaltending leaders ===
GP = Games played; Min = Minutes played; W = Wins; L = Losses; T = Ties; GA = Goals against; SO = Shutouts; SV% = Save percentage; GAA = Goals against average

minimum 30 games played

Player	Years	GP	Min	W	L	T	GA	SO	SV%	GAA
Carsen Chubak	2010–2013	45	2588	27	11	6	93	6	.930	2.16
Chris Noonan	2009–2012	61	3262	29	18	8	132	3	.922	2.43
Greg Gardner	1996–2000	113	6638	64	33	12	270	16	.907	2.44
Juliano Pagliero	2005–2009	98	5311	47	32	11	231	8	.921	2.61
Chad Veltri	2019–2023	98	5691	41	46	9	253	6	.910	2.67

Statistics current through the end of the 2023–24 season.

== Roster ==
As of August 30, 2025.

No.	Nat.	Player	Class	Pos	Height	Weight	DoB	Hometown	Previous team	NHL rights
1	(Latvia)	Deivs Rolovs	Sophomore	G	6' 2" (1.88 m)	183 lb (83 kg)	2004-05-08	Riga, Latvia	Lone Star Brahmas (NAHL)	—
2	(United States)	Jonathan Ziskie	Senior	F	6' 3" (1.91 m)	187 lb (85 kg)	2001-03-19	Macomb, Michigan	Bismarck Bobcats (NAHL)	—
3	(United States)	Mitchell Becker	Senior	D	6' 3" (1.91 m)	220 lb (100 kg)	2001-05-24	Rogers, Minnesota	Massachusetts Lowell (HEA)	—
4	(Latvia)	Gļebs Prohorenkovs	Senior	F	6' 2" (1.88 m)	187 lb (85 kg)	2001-11-12	Riga, Latvia	Amarillo Wranglers (NAHL)	—
8	(Canada)	Cameron Eke	Freshman	D	6' 2" (1.88 m)	198 lb (90 kg)	2005-04-23	St. Catharines, Ontario	Collingwood Blues (OJHL)	—
9	(Canada)	Nathan Oickle	Sophomore	D	5' 10" (1.78 m)	165 lb (75 kg)	2003-02-05	Peterborough, Ontario	Surrey Eagles (BCHL)	—
10	(Canada)	Hunter Wallace	Sophomore	F	5' 7" (1.7 m)	165 lb (75 kg)	2003-05-02	Oak Lake, Manitoba	Merrimack (HEA)	—
12	(United States)	Ross Roloson	Junior	D	5' 11" (1.8 m)	175 lb (79 kg)	2003-01-30	Woodbury, Minnesota	Lake Superior State (CCHA)	—
13	(Canada)	Grayson Dietrich	Senior	F	6' 2" (1.88 m)	190 lb (86 kg)	2001-12-18	Calgary, Alberta	American International (AHA)	—
14	(Latvia)	Marshall Finnie	Freshman	F	6' 2" (1.88 m)	194 lb (88 kg)	2004-01-02	Lethbridge, Alberta	Edmonton Oil Kings (WHL)	—
15	(Russia)	Maxim Muranov	Freshman	F	6' 2" (1.88 m)	185 lb (84 kg)	2004-06-02	Moskva, Russia	Vancouver Giants (WHL)	—
16	(Canada)	Andy Reist	Sophomore	F	6' 0" (1.83 m)	174 lb (79 kg)	2004-05-15	Waterloo, Ontario	Cobourg Cougars (OJHL)	—
18	(Canada)	Spencer Young	Sophomore	F	6' 0" (1.83 m)	174 lb (79 kg)	2003-08-25	Elmira, Ontario	Collingwood Blues (OJHL)	—
19	(United States)	Drew Vieten	Junior	F	6' 1" (1.85 m)	190 lb (86 kg)	2001-01-10	Calabasas, California	Wichita Falls Warriors (NAHL)	—
20	(Canada)	Tyson Zimmer	Freshman	F	6' 0" (1.83 m)	192 lb (87 kg)	2004-09-05	Russell, Manitoba	Vernon Vipers (BCHL)	—
21	(Canada)	Dallon Melin	Junior	F	6' 4" (1.93 m)	220 lb (100 kg)	2002-03-26	Camrose, Alberta	Calgary (CWUAA)	—
22	(Canada)	Lane Brockhoff	Graduate	D	6' 1" (1.85 m)	207 lb (94 kg)	2000-04-11	Edberg, Alberta	Camrose Kodiaks (AJHL)	—
24	(United States)	Nicholas Niemo	Senior	F	5' 9" (1.75 m)	165 lb (75 kg)	2001-03-28	Middlebury, Vermont	Maine (HEA)	—
25	(United States)	Declan McDonnell	Junior	F	5' 10" (1.78 m)	190 lb (86 kg)	2002-02-25	Buffalo, New York	Saint Mary's (AUS)	TBL, 217th overall 2020
26	(Canada)	Jacob Maillet	Sophomore	F	6' 1" (1.85 m)	205 lb (93 kg)	2003-03-13	Dundas, Ontario	St. Francis Xavier (AUS)	—
27	(Japan)	Ray Murakami	Sophomore	D	6' 0" (1.83 m)	181 lb (82 kg)	2003-04-03	Tomakomai, Japan	Lone Star Brahmas (NAHL)	—
28	(Canada)	Ethan Lund	Senior	D	5' 10" (1.78 m)	185 lb (84 kg)	2001-03-16	Calgary, Alberta	Brooks Bandits (AJHL)	—
30	(United States)	Mitchell Day	Junior	G	5' 10" (1.78 m)	175 lb (79 kg)	2002-01-18	St. Louis, Missouri	North Iowa Bulls (NAHL)	—
31	(United States)	Thomas Anderson	Freshman	G	6' 3" (1.91 m)	201 lb (91 kg)	2004-10-06	Stillwater, Minnesota	Bismarck Bobcats (NAHL)	—
34	(Canada)	Noah Hackett	Senior	F	6' 1" (1.85 m)	174 lb (79 kg)	2001-12-11	Ponoka, Alberta	Brooks Bandits (AJHL)	—

== Awards and honors ==
=== NCAA ===
==== All-Americans ====
AHCA Second Team All-Americans

- 2010–11: Paul Zanette, F

=== CHA ===
==== Individual awards ====
Player of the Year

- Greg Gardner: 1999
- Joe Tallari: 2003
- Barret Ehgoetz: 2004
- Jeff Van Nynatten: 2006
- Sean Bentivoglio: 2007
- Juliano Pagliero: 2009

Rookie of the Year

- Ted Cook: 2006
- Les Reaney: 2006
- Chris Moran: 2007

Most Valuable Player in Tournament

- Kyle Martin: 2000
- Jeff Van Nynatten: 2004
- Ted Cook: 2008

Coach of the Year

- Blaise MacDonald: 2000
- Dave Burkholder: 2006, 2007

Three-Star Player of the Year

- Ted Cook: 2007

Student-Athlete of the Year

- Vince Rocco: 2009

==== All-Conference teams ====
First Team All-CHA

- 1999–00: Greg Gardner, G; Chris MacKenzie, D; Kyle Martin, F; Mike Isherwood, F
- 2002–03: Joe Tallari, F
- 2003–04: Jeff Van Nynatten, G; Barret Ehgoetz, F
- 2004–05: Barret Ehgoetz, F
- 2005–06: Sean Bentivoglio, F
- 2006–07: Pat Oliveto, D; Sean Bentivoglio, F; Ted Cook, F
- 2007–08: Juliano Pagliero, G; Ryan Annesley, D; Vince Rocco, F
- 2008–09: Juliano Pagliero, G
- 2009–10: Chris Moran, F

Second Team All-CHA

- 1999–00: Mikko Sivonen, F
- 2000–01: Bernie Sigrist, F
- 2001–02: Scott Crawford, D
- 2002–03: Barret Ehgoetz, F
- 2003–04: Andrew Lackner, D; Joe Tallari, F
- 2004–05: Ryan Gale, F
- 2005–06: Jeff Van Nynatten, G; Ted Cook, F; Les Reaney, F
- 2006–07: Juliano Pagliero, G; Les Reaney, F
- 2007–08: Tyler Gotto, D; Matt Caruana, F
- 2008–09: Tyler Gotto, D; Vince Rocco, F; Egor Mironov, F
- 2009–10: Tyler Gotto, D; Ryan Olidis, F

All-CHA Rookie Team

- 2002–03: Brian Hartman, D; Jason Williamson, F
- 2003–04: Pat Oliveto, F
- 2005–06: Ted Cook, F; Les Reaney, F
- 2006–07: Tyler Gotto, D; Chris Moran, F
- 2007–08: Adam Avramenko, G
- 2008–09: Dan Baco, D
- 2009–10: Jason Beattie, F

=== Atlantic Hockey ===
==== Individual awards ====
Player of the Year

- Paul Zanette: 2011
- Carsen Chubak: 2013

Rookie of the Year

- Ludwig Stenlund: 2019
- Trevor Hoskin: 2025

Regular Season Goaltending Award

- Chris Noonan: 2012

Regular Season Scoring Trophy

- Paul Zanette: 2011

Coach of the Year

- Dave Burkholder: 2013

Most Valuable Player in Tournament

- Scott Champagne: 2005

==== All-Conference teams ====
First Team All-Atlantic Hockey

- 2010–11: Bryan Haczyk, F; Paul Zanette, F
- 2012–13: Carsen Chubak, G; Giancarlo Iuorio, F

Second Team All-Atlantic Hockey

- 2011–12: Chris Noonan, G
- 2012–13: Dan Weiss, D

Third Team All-Atlantic Hockey

- 2010–11: Ryan Annesley, D
- 2012–13: Kevin Ryan, D
- 2013–14: Kevin Ryan, D
- 2017–18: Derian Plouffe, F
- 2018–19: Noah Delmas, D; Ludwig Stenlund, F
- 2019–20: Jack Billings, F

Atlantic Hockey All-Rookie Team

- 2010–11: Ryan Rashid, F
- 2013–14: Vinny Muto, D
- 2014–15: Keegan Harper, D
- 2018–19: Ludwig Stenlund, F
- 2019–20: Chad Veltri, G
- 2020–21: Josef Mysak, D
- 2021–22: Shane Ott, F

=== Atlantic Hockey America ===
==== Individual awards ====
Rookie of the Year

- Trevor Hoskin (2025)

==== All-Conference teams ====
Second Team All-Atlantic Hockey America

- 2024–25: Trevor Hoskin, F

Third Team All-Atlantic Hockey America

- 2024–25: Jay Ahearn, F

All-Atlantic Hockey America Rookie Team

- 2024–25: Trevor Hoskin, F
- 2025–26: Maxim Muranov, F

== Niagara Purple Eagles Hall of Fame ==
The following is a list of people associated with the men's ice hockey program who were elected into the Niagara Purple Eagles Hall of Fame (induction date in parentheses).

- Greg Gardner (2006)
- Peter DeSantis (2007)
- Mile Isherwood (2007)
- Joe Tallari (2012)
- Barret Ehgoetz (2013)
- 1999-2000 Men's Team (2016)

== Purple Eagles in the NHL ==
As of July 1, 2025.

Player	Position	Team(s)	Years	Games	Stanley Cups
Sean Bentivoglio	Left Wing	NYI	2008–2009	1	0
Matt Ryan	Center	LAK	2005–2006	12	0

== See also ==
- Niagara Purple Eagles women's ice hockey
