= List of All-CHA Teams =

The All-CHA Teams are composed of players at all positions from teams that were members of College Hockey America men's conference, a former NCAA Division I hockey-only conference. Each year, from 1999–00 thru 2009–10, at the conclusion of the CHA regular season the head coaches of each member team vote for players to be placed on each all-conference team. All three teams (First, Second and Rookie) were named in every CHA season. The all-CHA teams were discontinued after the 2009–10 season when the CHA was disbanded when they could no longer retain their automatic bid to the NCAA Tournament.

The all-conference teams were composed of one goaltender, two defensemen and three forwards. If a tie occurred for the final selection at any position, both players were included as part of the all-conference team; if a tie resulted in an increase in the number of First Team all-stars, the Second Team would be reduced in numbers accordingly (as happened in 2007–08). Players may only appear once per year on any of the first or second teams but freshman may appear on both the rookie team and one of the other all-conference teams.

== All-conference teams ==
=== First Team ===
1999–00
| Player | Pos | Team |
|---|---|---|
| Greg Gardner | G | Niagara |
| Chris MacKenzie | D | Niagara |
| Stefan Bjork | D | Bemidji State |
| Kyle Martin | F | Niagara |
| Mike Isherwood | F | Niagara |
| Nathan Bowen | F | Alabama-Huntsville |

2000–01
| Player | Pos | Team |
|---|---|---|
| Marc Kielkucki | G | Air Force |
| Brant Somerville | D | Findlay |
| Darren Curry | D | Alabama-Huntsville |
| Brian Gornick | F | Air Force |
| Dwayne Blais | F | Alabama-Huntsville |
| Jason Durbin | F | Wayne State |

2001–02
| Player | Pos | Team |
|---|---|---|
| David Guerrera | G | Wayne State |
| Tyler Kindle | D | Wayne State |
| Tyler Butler | D | Alabama-Huntsville |
| Jason Durbin | F | Wayne State |
| Marty Goulet | F | Bemidji State |
| Derek Olson | F | Air Force |

2002–03
| Player | Pos | Team |
|---|---|---|
| Grady Hunt | G | Bemidji State |
| Ryan Leasa | D | Alabama-Huntsville |
| Bryce Methven | D | Bemidji State |
| Joe Tallari | F | Niagara |
| Marty Goulet | F | Bemidji State |
| Jared Ross | F | Alabama-Huntsville |

2003–04
| Player | Pos | Team |
|---|---|---|
| Jeff Van Nynatten | G | Niagara |
| Jeremy Schreiber | D | Alabama-Huntsville |
| Bryce Methven | D | Bemidji State |
| Jared Ross | F | Alabama-Huntsville |
| Barret Ehgoetz | F | Niagara |
| Brendan Cook | F | Bemidji State |

2004–05
| Player | Pos | Team |
|---|---|---|
| Scott Munroe | G | Alabama-Huntsville |
| Peter Jonsson | D | Bemidji State |
| Jeremy Schreiber | D | Alabama-Huntsville |
| Andrew Murray | F | Bemidji State |
| Jared Ross | F | Alabama-Huntsville |
| Barret Ehgoetz | F | Niagara |

2005–06
| Player | Pos | Team |
|---|---|---|
| Scott Munroe | G | Alabama-Huntsville |
| Andrew Martens | D | Bemidji State |
| Jeremy Schreiber | D | Alabama-Huntsville |
| Sean Bentivoglio | F | Niagara |
| Luke Erickson | F | Bemidji State |
| Bruce Mulherin | F | Alabama-Huntsville |

2006–07
| Player | Pos | Team |
|---|---|---|
| Matt Climie | G | Bemidji State |
| Shaun Arvai | D | Alabama-Huntsville |
| Pat Oliveto | D | Niagara |
| Sean Bentivoglio | F | Niagara |
| Ted Cook | F | Niagara |
| Travis Wright | F | Bemidji State |

2007–08
| Player | Pos | Team |
|---|---|---|
| Juliano Pagliero | G | Niagara |
| Jeff Caister | D | Wayne State |
| Cody Bostock | D | Bemidji State |
| Ryan Annesley | D | Niagara |
| Ryan Cruthers | F | Robert Morris |
| Vince Rocco | F | Niagara |
| Stavros Paskaris | F | Wayne State |

2008–09
| Player | Pos | Team |
|---|---|---|
| Juliano Pagliero | G | Niagara |
| Denny Urban | D | Robert Morris |
| Brad Hunt | D | Bemidji State |
| Matt Read | F | Bemidji State |
| Chris Margott | F | Robert Morris |
| Nathan Longpre | F | Robert Morris |

2009–10
| Player | Pos | Team |
|---|---|---|
| Dan Bakala | G | Bemidji State |
| Denny Urban | D | Robert Morris |
| Brad Hunt | D | Bemidji State |
| Matt Read | F | Bemidji State |
| Chris Moran | F | Niagara |
| Nathan Longpre | F | Robert Morris |

==== First Team players by school ====
| School | Winners |
|---|---|
| Bemidji State | 19 |
| Niagara | 17 |
| Alabama-Huntsville | 15 |
| Robert Morris | 6 |
| Wayne State | 6 |
| Air Force | 3 |
| Findlay | 1 |

==== Multiple appearances ====
| Player | First Team appearances |
|---|---|
| Jared Ross | 3 |
| Jeremy Schreiber | 3 |
| Sean Bentivoglio | 2 |
| Jason Durbin | 2 |
| Barret Ehgoetz | 2 |
| Marty Goulet | 2 |
| Brad Hunt | 2 |
| Nathan Longpre | 2 |
| Bryce Methven | 2 |
| Scott Munroe | 2 |
| Juliano Pagliero | 2 |
| Matt Read | 2 |
| Denny Urban | 2 |

=== Second Team ===
1999–00
| Player | Pos | Team |
|---|---|---|
| Steve Briere | G | Alabama-Huntsville |
| Shane Stewart | D | Alabama-Huntsville |
| Brant Somerville | D | Findlay |
| Mikko Sivonen | F | Niagara |
| Calvin Chartrand | F | Bemidji State |
| Brian Gornick | F | Air Force |

2000–01
| Player | Pos | Team |
|---|---|---|
| Kevin Fines | G | Findlay |
| Clay Simmons | D | Bemidji State |
| Tyler Kindle | D | Wayne State |
| Karlis Zirnis | F | Alabama-Huntsville |
| Bernie Sigrist | F | Niagara |
| Andy Berg | F | Air Force |

2001–02
| Player | Pos | Team |
|---|---|---|
| Grady Hunt | G | Bemidji State |
| Scott Crawford | D | Niagara |
| Brant Somerville | D | Findlay |
| Chris Vail | F | Wayne State |
| Riley Riddell | F | Bemidji State |
| Rigel Shaw | F | Findlay |
| Steve Charlebois | F | Alabama-Huntsville |

2002–03
| Player | Pos | Team |
|---|---|---|
| Scott Munroe | G | Alabama-Huntsville |
| Tyler Butler | D | Alabama-Huntsville |
| Keith Stanich | D | Wayne State |
| Steve Charlebois | F | Alabama-Huntsville |
| Andy Berg | F | Air Force |
| Barret Ehgoetz | F | Niagara |

2003–04
| Player | Pos | Team |
|---|---|---|
| Grady Hunt | G | Bemidji State |
| Andrew Lackner | D | Niagara |
| Peter Jonsson | D | Bemidji State |
| Kris Wiebe | F | Findlay |
| Joe Tallari | F | Niagara |
| Riley Riddell | F | Bemidji State |

2004–05
| Player | Pos | Team |
|---|---|---|
| Matt Kelly | G | Wayne State |
| Brian Gineo | D | Air Force |
| Jeff Winchester | D | Alabama-Huntsville |
| Bruce Mulherin | F | Alabama-Huntsville |
| Brendan Cook | F | Bemidji State |
| Ryan Gale | F | Niagara |

2005–06
| Player | Pos | Team |
|---|---|---|
| Jeff Van Nynatten | G | Niagara |
| Steve Kovalchik | D | Wayne State |
| Michael Mayra | D | Air Force |
| Ted Cook | F | Niagara |
| Eric Ehn | F | Air Force |
| Les Reaney | F | Niagara |

2006–07
| Player | Pos | Team |
|---|---|---|
| Juliano Pagliero | G | Niagara |
| Dan Iliakis | D | Wayne State |
| Mike Salekin | D | Alabama-Huntsville |
| Aaron Clarke | F | Robert Morris |
| Grant Selinger | F | Alabama-Huntsville |
| Les Reaney | F | Niagara |

2007–08
| Player | Pos | Team |
|---|---|---|
| Matt Climie | G | Bemidji State |
| Tyler Gotto | D | Niagara |
| | D | |
| Matt Caruana | F | Niagara |
| Travis Winter | F | Bemidji State |
| Chris Margott | F | Robert Morris |

2008–09
| Player | Pos | Team |
|---|---|---|
| Matt Dalton | G | Bemidji State |
| Tyler Gotto | D | Niagara |
| Cody Bostock | D | Bemidji State |
| Tyler Scofield | F | Bemidji State |
| Vince Rocco | F | Niagara |
| Egor Mironov | F | Niagara |

2009–10
| Player | Pos | Team |
|---|---|---|
| Cam Talbot | G | Alabama-Huntsville |
| Dave Cowan | D | Robert Morris |
| Tyler Gotto | D | Niagara |
| Chris Kushneriuk | F | Robert Morris |
| Ian Lowe | F | Bemidji State |
| Ryan Olidis | F | Niagara |

==== Second Team players by school ====
| School | Winners |
|---|---|
| Niagara | 19 |
| Bemidji State | 14 |
| Alabama-Huntsville | 12 |
| Air Force | 6 |
| Wayne State | 6 |
| Findlay | 5 |
| Robert Morris | 4 |

==== Multiple appearances ====
| Player | First Team appearances |
|---|---|
| Tyler Gotto | 3 |
| Andy Berg | 2 |
| Steve Charlebois | 2 |
| Grady Hunt | 2 |
| Les Reaney | 2 |
| Riley Riddell | 2 |
| Brant Somerville | 2 |

=== Rookie Team ===
1999–00
| Player | Pos | Team |
|---|---|---|
| Bob Tallarico | G | Bemidji State |
| Clay Simmonds | D | Bemidji State |
| Rico Faticci | D | Bemidji State |
| Mike Funk | F | Alabama-Huntsville |
| Andy Berg | F | Air Force |
| Brad Johnson | F | Bemidji State |
| Daryl Bat | F | Bemidji State |

2000–01
| Player | Pos | Team |
|---|---|---|
| Kevin Fines | G | Findlay |
| Joe Locallo | D | Air Force |
| Bryce Methven | D | Bemidji State |
| Aaron Weegar | F | Findlay |
| Christian Olson | F | Findlay |
| Chris Vail | F | Wayne State |

2001–02
| Player | Pos | Team |
|---|---|---|
| Zach Sikich | G | Air Force |
| Doug Watkins | D | Alabama-Huntsville |
| Anders Olsson | D | Bemidji State |
| Jared Ross | F | Alabama-Huntsville |
| Andrew Murray | F | Bemidji State |
| Riley Riddell | F | Bemidji State |
| Rigel Shaw | F | Findlay |

2002–03
| Player | Pos | Team |
|---|---|---|
| Scott Munroe | G | Alabama-Huntsville |
| Jeremy Schreiber | D | Alabama-Huntsville |
| Brian Hartman | D | Niagara |
| Derek McKay | F | Wayne State |
| Andrew Radzak | F | Findlay |
| Jason Williamson | F | Niagara |

2003–04
| Player | Pos | Team |
|---|---|---|
| Will Hooper | G | Findlay |
| Kenny Macaulay | D | Findlay |
| Pat Oliveto | D | Niagara |
| Mike Batovanja | F | Findlay |
| Luke Erickson | F | Bemidji State |
| Nate Higgins | F | Wayne State |

2004–05
| Player | Pos | Team |
|---|---|---|
| Matt Climie | G | Bemidji State |
| Chris Kaufman | D | Robert Morris |
| Matt Charbonneau | D | Air Force |
| Eric Ehn | F | Air Force |
| Stavros Paskaris | F | Wayne State |
| Jace Buzek | F | Robert Morris |

2005–06
| Player | Pos | Team |
|---|---|---|
| | G | |
| Cody Bostock | D | Bemidji State |
| Michael Mayra | D | Air Force |
| Ted Cook | F | Niagara |
| Chris Margott | F | Robert Morris |
| Les Reaney | F | Niagara |
| Tyler Scofield | F | Bemidji State |

2006–07
| Player | Pos | Team |
|---|---|---|
| Brett Bothwell | G | Wayne State |
| Jeff Caister | D | Wayne State |
| Tyler Gotto | D | Niagara |
| Jared Katz | F | Wayne State |
| Joey Moggach | F | Bemidji State |
| Chris Moran | F | Niagara |

2007–08
| Player | Pos | Team |
|---|---|---|
| Adam Avramenko | G | Niagara |
| Denny Urban | D | Robert Morris |
| Ryan Adams | D | Wayne State |
| Matt Read | F | Bemidji State |
| Nathan Longpre | F | Robert Morris |
| Andrew Coburn | F | Alabama-Huntsville |

2008–09
| Player | Pos | Team |
|---|---|---|
| Brooks Ostergard | G | Robert Morris |
| James Lyle | D | Robert Morris |
| Brad Hunt | D | Bemidji State |
| Dan Baco | F | Niagara |
| Cody Campbell | F | Alabama-Huntsville |
| Ben Kinne | F | Bemidji State |

2009–10
| Player | Pos | Team |
|---|---|---|
| Mathieu Dugas | G | Bemidji State |
| Jason Beattie | D | Niagara |
| Jake Areshenko | D | Bemidji State |
| Stefan Salituro | F | Robert Morris |
| Matti Järvinen | F | Alabama-Huntsville |
| Jordan George | F | Bemidji State |

==== First Team players by school ====
| School | Winners |
|---|---|
| Bemidji State | 20 |
| Niagara | 10 |
| Alabama-Huntsville | 8 |
| Findlay | 8 |
| Robert Morris | 8 |
| Wayne State | 8 |
| Air Force | 6 |

== See also ==
- CHA Awards
