= Nathan Longpre =

Canadian ice hockey player

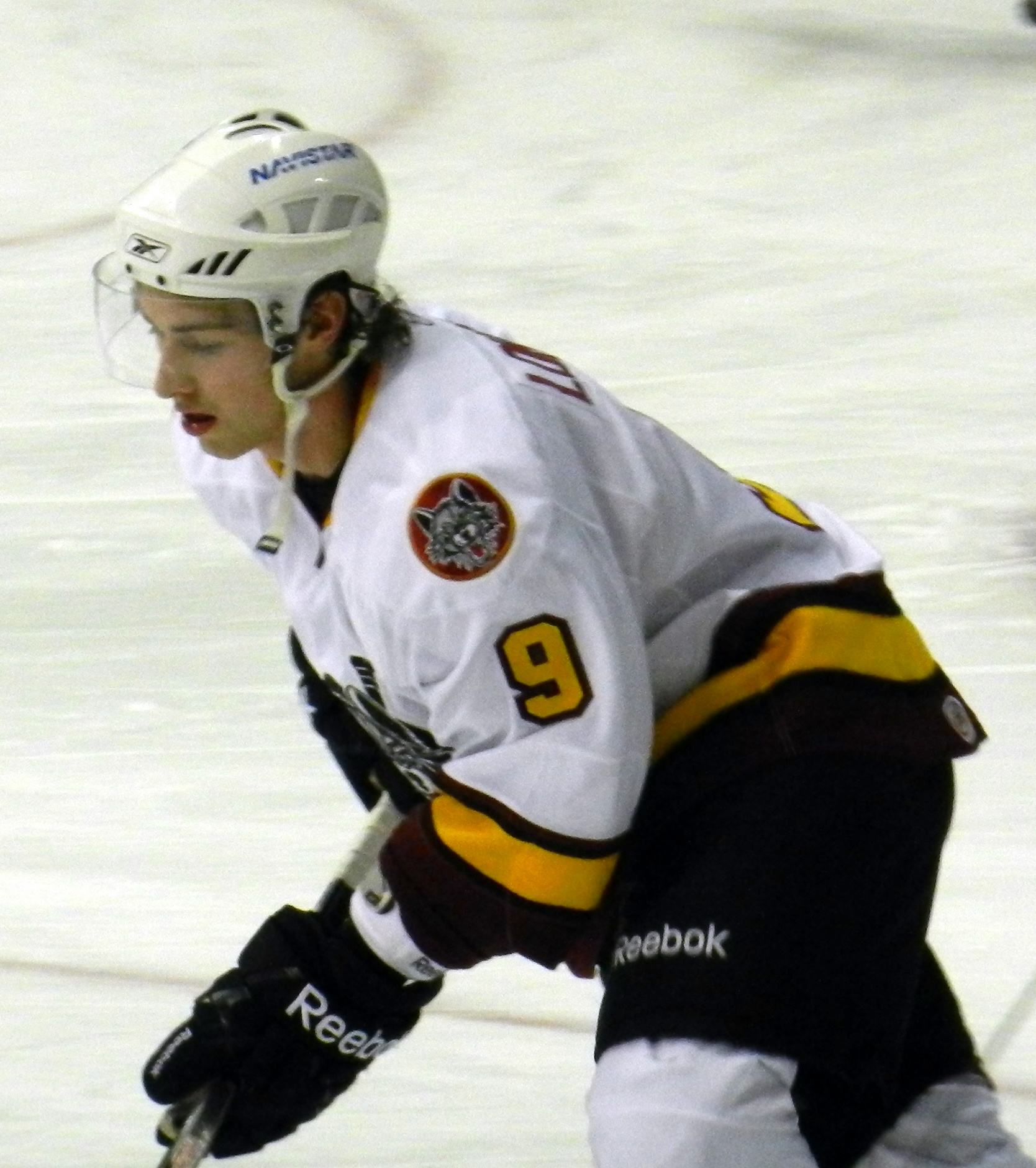
- Born: July 16, 1988 (age 38) Peterborough, Ontario, Canada
- Height: 6 ft 0 in (183 cm)
- Weight: 170 lb (77 kg; 12 st 2 lb)
- Position: Forward
- Shoots: Left
- ML team Former teams: SønderjyskE Ishockey; Worcester Sharks; Chicago Wolves; Springfield Falcons; Peoria Rivermen; Lørenskog IK
- NHL draft: Undrafted
- Playing career: 2011–present

Nathan Thomas Longpre (born July 16, 1988) is a Canadian professional ice hockey player who is currently playing for SønderjyskE Ishockey in the Metal Ligaen. He has previously played in the American Hockey League for the Worcester Sharks, Chicago Wolves, Springfield Falcons and the Peoria Rivermen.

Longpre played college hockey at Robert Morris University (RMU). In his freshman year he was one of the team's Co-Rookies of the Year and was named to the College Hockey America all-rookie team. Over the next three seasons he was twice a First-Team All-College Hockey America as well as an Atlantic Hockey First-Team All-Star. At the conclusion of his collegiate career Longpre set RMU team records for goals in a game, career assists, and career points.

Undrafted out of college he attended the Vancouver Canucks prospect camp as an unsigned player. Unable to make the team's National Hockey League roster he was assigned to their AHL affiliate Chicago signing a contract with them. Chicago traded him to Springfield for the final 20 games of the season. He returned to the Wolves the following year as a free agent.

== Playing career ==
=== Amateur ===
Longpre played a season of junior hockey for the Mahoning Valley Phantoms in the North American Hockey League. In his lone year he recorded 27 goals and 65 points, 14 of his goals came on the power play and an additional 5 were scored shorthanded. His point total was second on the team and tenth in the league, while both power play and shorthanded goal totals led the team while ranking second and third in the league respectively.

Following his one season at Mahoning Valley Longpre attend Robert Morris University (RMU). In his first season with the Colonials Longpre scored 7 goals and 24 points to lead all freshmen and finish fifth overall in team scoring. For his performance he was named RMU's Co-Rookie of the Year along with Denny Urban. As well as being named to the College Hockey America all-rookie team. The Colonials entered the 2008 CHA Tournament as the number three seed and faced the number two seeded and tournament host Niagara University. In the game Longpre tallied a power play assist which helped tie the game at three. Following his assist Niagara scored three straight goals to win the game 6–3 and eliminate RMU from the tournament.

In the 2008–09 season Longpre improved to 12 goals and 29 assist for 41 points. His assist total led College Hockey America (CHA), while his 41 points ranked 17th in college hockey and second on RMU. RMU finished third in the CHA and in the 2009 CHA Tournament they again matched up with Niagara. The Colonials upset the number two Purple Eagles 2–1 and advanced to the championship game against Bemidji State University. In the championship game RMU lost 3–2 in overtime. In the tournament Longpre notch a single assist, coming on the Colonials second goal of the championship game. At the end of the season Longpre was named First-Team All-College Hockey America. Prior to the start of the 2009–10 season Longpre was invited to participate in the Pittsburgh Penguins' prospect camp as an unrestricted free agent. While at camp he posted some of the highest scores on the training drills. He returned to RMU where he set a new school record four goals in a game against Quinnipiac University. He added an assist in the same game to tie the RMU school record for points in a game with five. He finished the year as the third-leading goal scorer in the CHA with 14. Adding 17 assist Longpre completed the season with 31, which made him RMUs second-leading career scorer. RMU finished second in the CHA. In the CHA Tournament they matched up against number three Alabama-Huntsville in the first round. In the game Longpre had a team-high six shots on goal, but was unable to score as RMU was shut out 1–0 and was eliminated from the tournament. At the end of the season Longpre was again named First-Team All-College Hockey America.

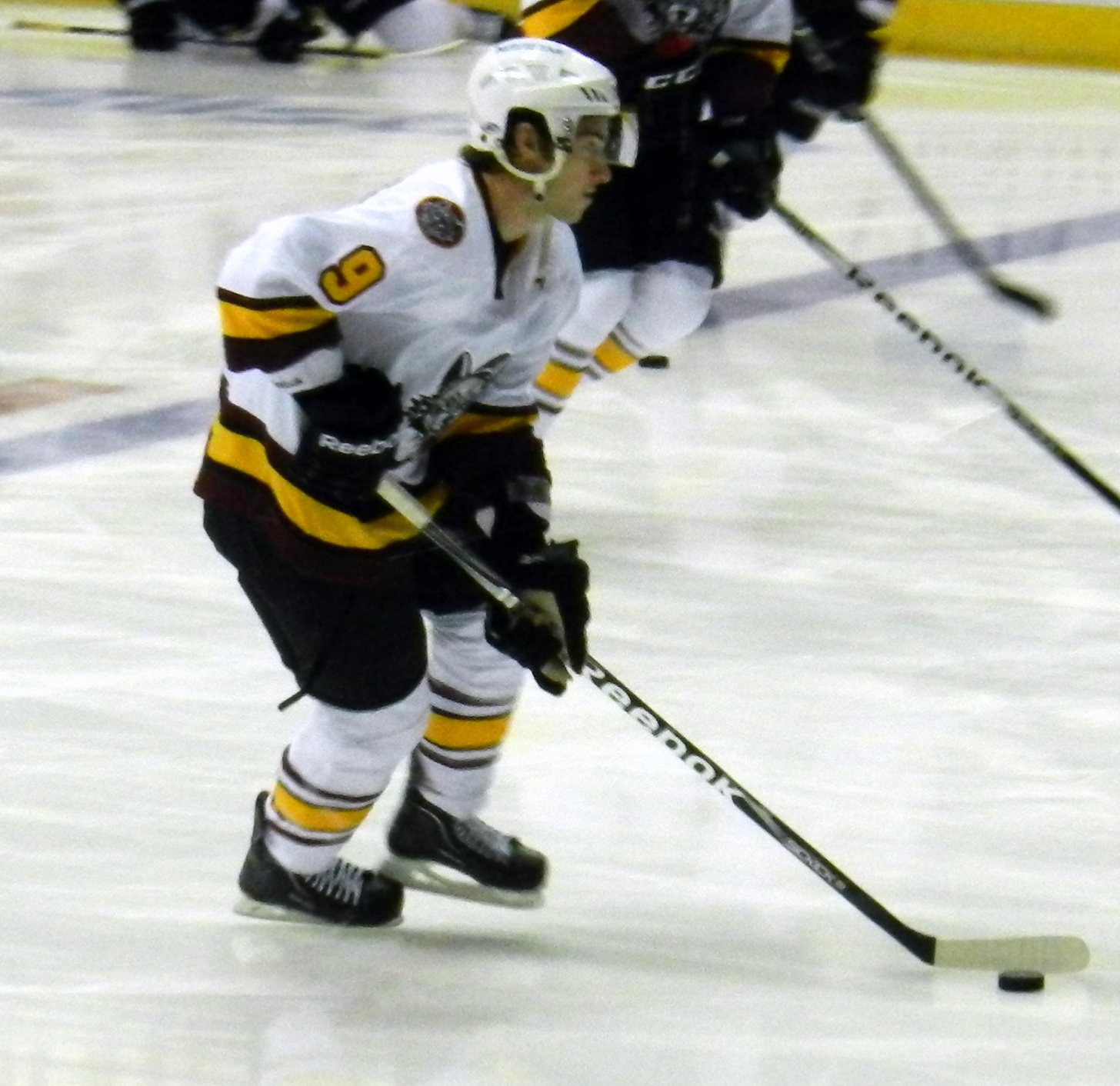
Longpre in 2011 with the Chicago Wolves

Prior to his senior season RMU moved to the Atlantic Hockey Association (AHA). Longpre's strong play continued in the new league and he was named as one of the top 68 candidates for the Hobey Baker Award. In a game versus Sacred Heart Longpre registered four assists. His fourth surpassed former teammate Chris Margott for RMU's all-time career leader in assists. In their first Atlantic Hockey Tournament RMU matched up with Mercyhurst University, who defeated RMU 5–1 with Longpre being held scoreless. He finished the season registering 14 goals and 28 assist for a career high 42 points. Longpre tallied 138 points for his career, which made him RMU's all-time leading scorer, again surpassing Margott. Longpre finished his senior year by collecting his fourth consecutive post season honor when he was named an Atlantic Hockey First-Team All-Star.

=== Professional ===
At the completion of his college career Longpre signed an amateur try-out contract with the American Hockey League's (AHL) Worcester Sharks. He played in eight games for Worcester registering one assist. The following season Longpre attended the Vancouver Canucks prospect camp as an unsigned player. He was one of the oldest players in camp. Longpre excelled at the camp and in the corresponding Young Stars Tournament he was among the top point producers for Vancouver, recording three points in three games. Longpre's performance earned him an invite to the Canucks main training camp. He failed to make the Canucks roster, but was assigned to their AHL affiliate, the Chicago Wolves, who signed him to a professional try-out contract. After his first 11 games with the Wolves he registered five goals and three assists and was signed to a standard player's contract for the remainder of the season. Longpre played in 39 games for the Wolves registering 18 points before being traded to the Springfield Falcons for future consideration. Playing in 20 games for the Falcons Longpre scored 3 goals. During the off-season Longpre re-signed with the Wolves as a free agent.

On June 4, 2015, Longpre signed a one-year European contract with Norwegian club, Lørenskog IK of the GET-ligaen. After a rather unsuccessful short stint at SønderjyskE in the Danish Metalligaen for the 2016/17 season, the club and the player decided to terminate his contract. Longpre decided to retire from professional ice hockey in order to pursue a career as a fire fighter in Canada.

== Personal life ==
Longpre was born on July 16, 1988, to Mike and Cathy Longpre in Peterborough, Ontario. He has three siblings, sister Erin, brothers, Matt and Graham.

== Career statistics ==
			Regular season					Playoffs
Season	Team	League	GP	G	A	Pts	PIM	GP	G	A	Pts	PIM
2004–05	Peterborough Bees	OPJHL	41	5	8	13	2	—	—	—	—	—
2005–06	Peterborough Stars	OPJHL	48	24	43	67	26	—	—	—	—	—
2006–07	Mahoning Valley Phantoms	NAHL	61	27	38	65	36	—	—	—	—	—
2007–08	Robert Morris University	CHA	33	7	17	24	8	—	—	—	—	—
2008–09	Robert Morris University	CHA	36	12	29	41	14	—	—	—	—	—
2009–10	Robert Morris University	CHA	34	14	17	31	26	—	—	—	—	—
2010–11	Robert Morris University	AHA	33	14	28	42	29	—	—	—	—	—
2010–11	Worcester Sharks	AHL	8	0	1	1	4	—	—	—	—	—
2011–12	Chicago Wolves	AHL	39	8	10	18	4	—	—	—	—	—
2011–12	Springfield Falcons	AHL	20	3	0	3	6	—	—	—	—	—
2012–13	Chicago Wolves	AHL	53	4	8	12	23	—	—	—	—	—
2012–13	Peoria Rivermen	AHL	4	2	1	3	2	—	—	—	—	—
2013–14	Chicago Wolves	AHL	66	6	14	20	10	9	2	1	3	0
2014–15	Chicago Wolves	AHL	28	1	3	4	2	2	0	0	0	0
2014–15	Kalamazoo Wings	ECHL	33	10	17	27	6	—	—	—	—	—
2015–16	Lørenskog IK	GET	42	14	35	49	26	13	3	5	8	4
AHL totals			218	24	37	61	51	11	2	1	3	0

== Awards and honours ==
Award	Year
All-CHA Rookie Team	2007–08
All-CHA First Team	2008–09
All-CHA First Team	2009–10
All-Atlantic Hockey First Team	2010–11
