= Ryan Cruthers =

American ice hockey player and coach (born 1984)

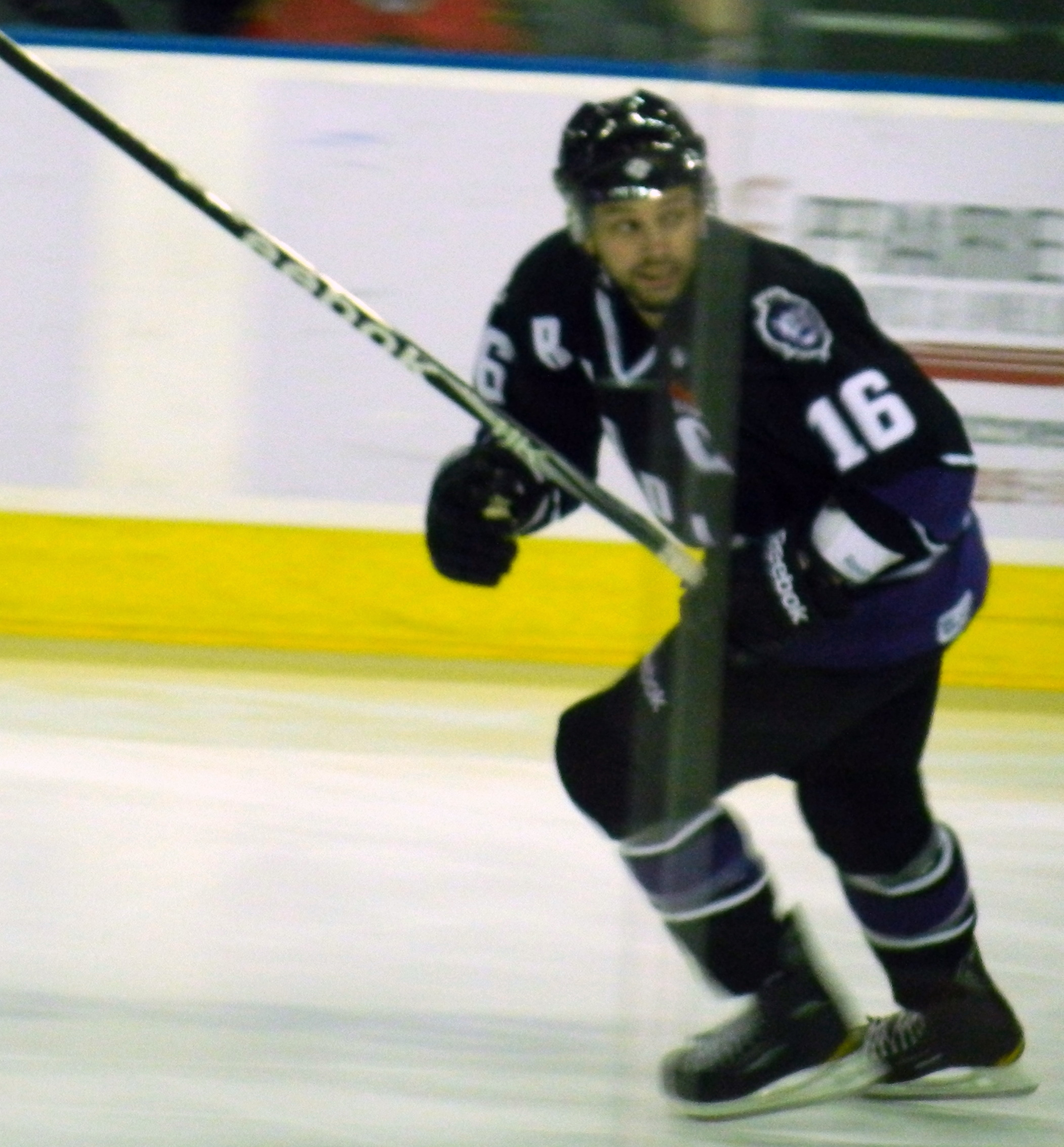
- Cruthers with the Reading Royals in 2012
- Born: July 4, 1984 (age 42) Farmingdale, New York, USA
- Height: 6 ft 0 in (183 cm)
- Weight: 192 lb (87 kg; 13 st 10 lb)
- Position: Center
- Shot: Right
- Played for: Lake Erie Monsters; Albany River Rats; Norfolk Admirals; Manitoba Moose; Hershey Bears
- NHL draft: Undrafted
- Playing career: 2008–2015

Ryan Cruthers
Biographical details
- Education: Robert Morris University

Coaching career (HC unless noted)
- 2013–2014: Alvernia (assistant)
- 2014–2015: Reading Royals (assistant)
- 2015–2018: Charlotte Rush
- 2017: Reading Royals (assistant)
- 2017–2018: Chicago Steel
- 2018–2019: Corpus Christi IceRays
- 2019–2020: Robert Morris (assistant)
- 2021–2022: Charlotte Rush
- 2022–2023: Sioux Falls Stampede (assistant)
- 2023–2024: Fayetteville Marksmen
- 2024–: Sioux Falls Stampede

Ryan Cruthers (born July 4, 1984) is a former professional ice hockey player and current head coach of the Sioux Falls Stampede of the United States Hockey League (USHL).

During Cruthers' pre-collegiate career he won an Eastern Junior Hockey League championship with the New York Apple Core and a New York State Championship with St. Mary's High School. Cruthers then attended West Point, the United States Military Academy, before transferring to Robert Morris University (RMU), where he sat out his first year due to NCAA transfer restrictions before Cruthers became a top collegiate player in his senior year. Cruthers graduated from RMU with degree in Sports Management. In 2019, he became the assistant coach of the NCAA Robert Morris of Atlantic Hockey.

== Playing career ==
=== Youth and junior hockey ===
Cruthers scored 43 goals and 60 assists for 103 points during his term with the New York Apple Core of the Eastern Junior Hockey League (EJHL) and won an EJHL championship in 2003. Cruthers also had 101 penalty minutes. In July 2008, Cruthers was inducted into the New York Apple Core Hall of Fame. This was the first class inducted and included 25 previous Apple Core players, coaches, owner.

During his stay at St. Mary's High School, he won a New York State High School Championship.

=== Collegiate career ===
Cruthers' first collegiate team was the United States Military Academy. During Cruthers 2003–04 season, he finished tied as the leader in scoring for team. He had 18 points his freshman year with 13 assists and 5 goals. Cruthers won the Heinmiller Award for the most outstanding freshman that year. After his successful first season of play, Cruthers came in second for scoring during the 2004–05 season, but he led the team with 10 assists and then tacked on an extra 6 goals for 16 points that season.

In an article written by Keith Koval for Robert Morris University, Cruthers talked about his decision to transfer schools. Cruthers stated "I left on good terms", Cruthers said. "Being there for two years, I decided hockey was my passion and I wanted to pursue hockey opportunities after college instead of serving time in the military. I thought the best way to do that was to transfer."

After Cruthers' decision to leave USMA, he called Derek Schooley, the new head coach of RMU men's hockey team. Schooley, formerly an assistant coach for Air Force, had recruited Ryan before his decision to attend West Point and offered Cruthers a spot on RMU's team. Cruthers was forced to sit out the 2005–2006 season due to NCAA Division I transfer restrictions.

He returned to play for the 2006–07 season and led the team with 37 points, 17 goals and 20 assists. Cruthers' was named captain for his senior year in 2007–08 and had 22 goals and 27 assists in his final season. He was third in the nation in points per game and top ten for assists. He was nominated for the Hobey Baker Award, the award given for the best player in NCAA Division I hockey. Cruthers was also nominated for the Lowe's Senior Class, an award for the top collegiate hockey players.

Cruthers is also the first Robert Morris Hockey player to be called up to an American Hockey League team.

=== Professional career ===
Immediately upon the completion of the 2007–08 collegiate season, Cruthers signed with the Utah Grizzlies, the ECHL team affiliated with the New York Islanders. Cruthers played four regular season games with the Grizzlies, getting two assists. He was called up to the Bridgeport Sound Tigers (AHL) for one game, but did not dress. He played 15 postseason games with Utah, which played into the conference finals, scoring one goal and four assists. In the 2008–09 season, Cruthers was signed by the Mississippi Sea Wolves and led the team in scoring with 66 points (29 goals and 37 assists). Cruthers was also recalled to the American Hockey League on three occasions for a total of nine games: five games for the Lake Erie Monsters and four games for the Albany River Rats.

In the 2009–10 season, Cruthers initially signed with defending Central Hockey League champion Texas Brahmas, but left after four games when he was offered a contract by the Reading Royals of the ECHL. He led the team in scoring with 71 points in 60 games and the entire ECHL in playoff scoring with 24 points as the Royals reached the finals in the American Conference. During the season, Cruthers was also signed to a try-out contract with the Norfolk Admirals of the AHL, totaling one assist in eight games.

On August 24, 2010, Cruthers signed as a free agent to a one-year contract to remain with the Royals and would be named captain of the team. During the 2010–11 season with Reading, he would play in the AHL on try-out contracts for the Lake Erie Monsters, Manitoba Moose, and Hershey Bears.

During the 2011–12 season on March 8, 2012, the Royals traded Cruthers to the Alaska Aces in exchange for young prospect Ethan Cox and future considerations. At season's end Cruthers, a free agent, became the first player to sign with the expansion Orlando Solar Bears on with a one-year deal on July 17, 2012.

He returned to the Reading Royals for two more seasons, Cruther announced his retirement from professional hockey and accepted a head coaching position with the Charlotte Rush of the United States Premier Hockey League on June 29, 2015. In 2018, he was named the head coach and assistant general manager of the Chicago Steel, a Tier I junior team in the United States Hockey League. At the end of the season, he joined the Tier II junior Corpus Christi IceRays of the North American Hockey League as head coach.

== Career statistics ==
			Regular season					Playoffs
Season	Team	League	GP	G	A	Pts	PIM	GP	G	A	Pts	PIM
2003–04	Army	AHA	29	5	13	18	42	—	—	—	—	—
2004–05	Army	AHA	18	6	10	16	14	—	—	—	—	—
2006–07	Robert Morris University	CHA	34	17	20	37	32	—	—	—	—	—
2007–08	Robert Morris University	CHA	34	22	27	49	40	—	—	—	—	—
2007–08	Utah Grizzlies	ECHL	4	0	2	2	2	15	1	4	5	4
2008–09	Mississippi Sea Wolves	ECHL	65	29	37	66	72	—	—	—	—	—
2008–09	Lake Erie Monsters	AHL	5	0	2	2	2	—	—	—	—	—
2008–09	Albany River Rats	AHL	4	0	0	0	8	—	—	—	—	—
2009–10	Texas Brahmas	CHL	4	0	0	0	2	—	—	—	—	—
2009–10	Reading Royals	ECHL	60	22	49	71	71	16	8	16	24	12
2009–10	Norfolk Admirals	AHL	8	0	1	1	2	—	—	—	—	—
2010–11	Reading Royals	ECHL	51	22	35	57	44	8	5	3	8	4
2010–11	Lake Erie Monsters	AHL	1	0	0	0	0	—	—	—	—	—
2010–11	Manitoba Moose	AHL	12	3	1	4	11	—	—	—	—	—
2010–11	Hershey Bears	AHL	2	0	0	0	0	—	—	—	—	—
2011–12	Reading Royals	ECHL	48	11	28	39	77	—	—	—	—	—
2011–12	Alaska Aces	ECHL	11	2	1	3	6	10	4	2	6	29
2012–13	Orlando Solar Bears	ECHL	71	23	22	45	138	—	—	—	—	—
2013–14	Reading Royals	ECHL	53	16	40	56	42	5	0	2	2	6
2014–15	Reading Royals	ECHL	66	15	35	50	65	7	1	4	5	9
AHL totals			32	3	4	7	23	—	—	—	—	—

== Awards and honours ==
Award	Year
College
All-CHA First Team	2007–08

- Heinmiller Award (USMA)
- CHA Player of the Year 2008 (College Hockey America)
- Most Valuable Player 2008 (RMU)
- Best Offensive Player 2008 (RMU)
- Easton Three Star Award (College Hockey America)
- Third Team All American (Inside College Hockey)
- 2007 All Tournament Team (NYE Frontier Classic)

Cruthers was also nominated for two of the most coveted collegiate hockey awards:

- Hobey Baker Award
- Lowes Senior Class Award

Awards and achievements
Preceded by Sean Bentivoglio	CHA Player of the Year; 2007–08	Succeeded by Juliano Pagliero
Preceded by Ted Cook	Easton Three-Star Player of the Year; 2007–08	Succeeded by Award Discontinued
