= Luke Erickson =

American ice hockey player (born 1982)

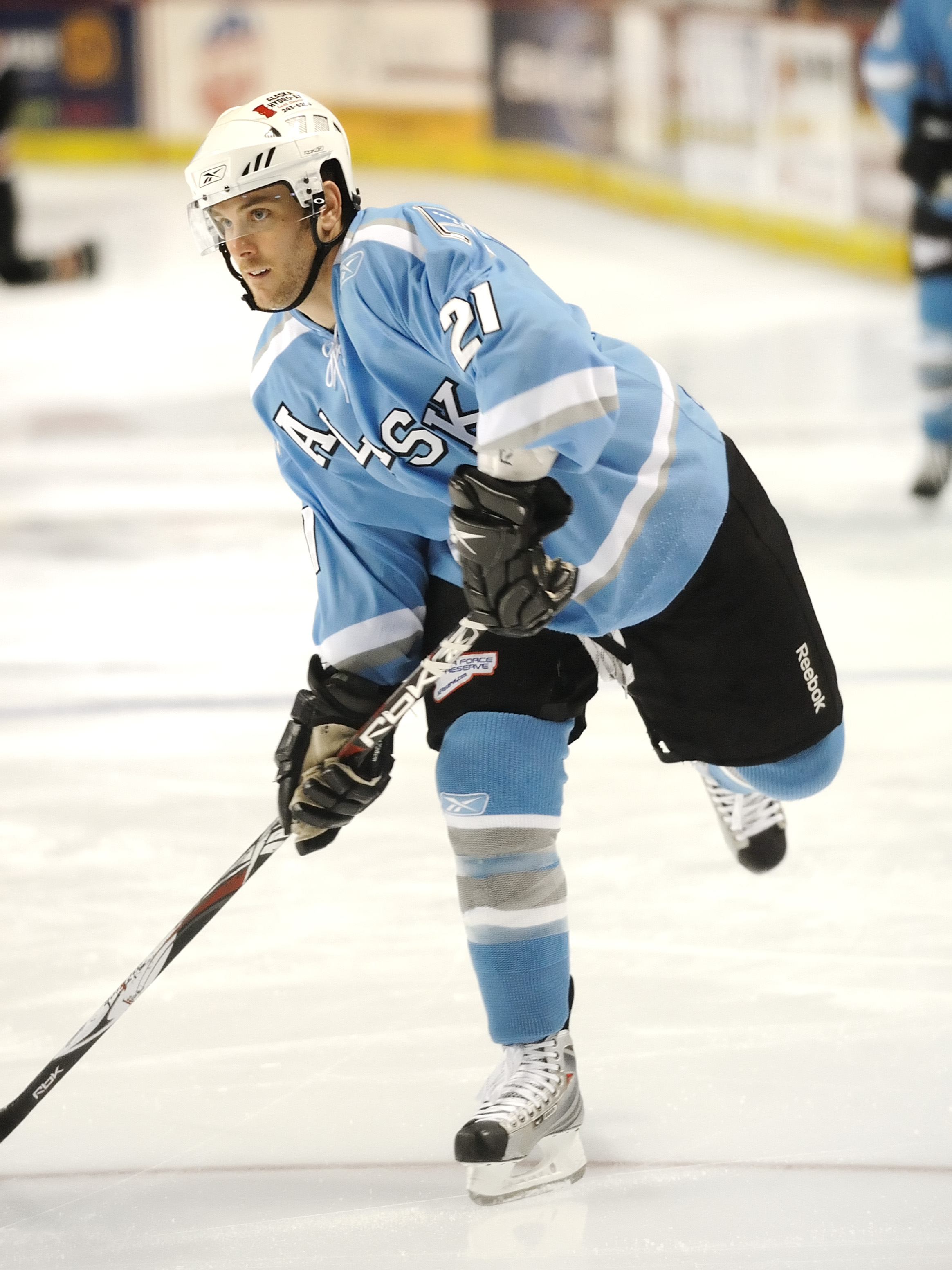
- Erickson in 2009 with the Alaska Aces
- Born: December 24, 1982 (age 42) Roseau, Minnesota, U.S.
- Height: 5 ft 8 in (173 cm)
- Weight: 161 lb (73 kg; 11 st 7 lb)
- Position: Center
- Shot: Right
- Played for: Gwinnett Gladiators; Pensacola Ice Pilots; Alaska Aces; Rapid City Rush; Arizona Sundogs
- Playing career: 2007–2012

Luke Erickson (born December 24, 1982) is an American former professional ice hockey center who played in the Central Hockey League (CHL) and ECHL.

== Playing career ==
Erickson started his career in the United States Hockey League (USHL) in the 2001–02 season, playing for the Lincoln Stars. In the middle of his second season with the Stars, he was traded to the Topeka Scarecrows. Luke attended Bemidji State University for four seasons beginning in 2003–04. After his college career, he signed with the Gwinnett Gladiators of the ECHL, where he played for 11 games at the remainder of the 2006–07 season. He then signed with the Pensacola Ice Pilots of the ECHL for the 2007-2008 season and the Alaska Aces, also of the ECHL, for the 2008-2009 season. He then signed with the Rapid City Rush of the CHL for the 2009-2010 season. On November 12, 2010, he was traded by Rapid City to the Arizona Sundogs.

== Career statistics ==
			Regular season					Playoffs
Season	Team	League	GP	G	A	Pts	PIM	GP	G	A	Pts	PIM
2001–02	Lincoln Stars	USHL	61	23	24	47	44	4	0	2	2	0
2002–03	Lincoln Stars	USHL	15	6	8	14	12	-	-	-	-	-
2002–03	Topeka ScareCrows	USHL	49	25	32	57	60	4	1	0	1	4
2003–04	Bemidji State University	CHA	35	12	20	32	29
2004–05	Bemidji State University	CHA	35	11	27	38	42
2005-06	Bemidji State University	CHA	37	16	19	35	42
2006–07	Bemidji State University	CHA	18	13	3	16	12
2006–07	Gwinnett Gladiators	ECHL	11	3	3	6	8	-	-	-	-	-
2007–08	Pensacola Ice Pilots	ECHL	70	15	16	31	32	-	-	-	-	-
2008–09	Alaska Aces	ECHL	68	21	34	55	75	21	5	3	8	8
2009–10	Rapid City Rush	CHL	48	15	22	37	13	-	-	-	-	-
2010–11	Rapid City Rush	CHL	6	2	2	4	0	-	-	-	-	-
2010–11	Arizona Sundogs	CHL	11	7	8	15	10	-	-	-	-	-

== Awards and honors ==
Award	Year
All-CHA Rookie Team	2003–04
All-CHA First Team	2005–06

Awards and achievements
Preceded by Scott Munroe	CHA Rookie of the Year; 2003-04	Succeeded by Stavros Paskaris
