= Scott Munroe =

Canadian ice hockey player and coach

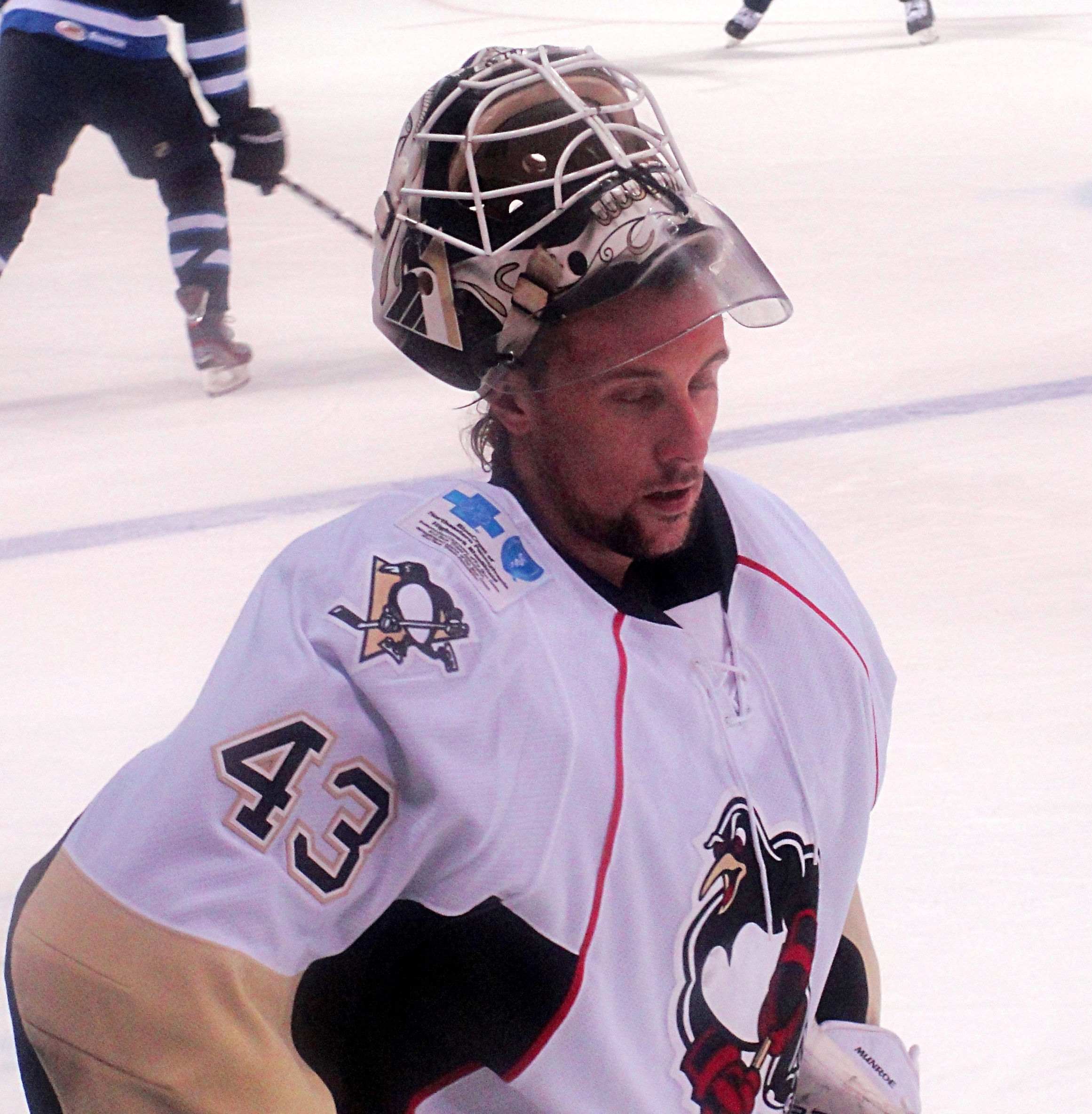
- Munroe with Wilkes-Barre/Scranton Penguins during the 2012 Calder Cup Playoffs
- Born: January 20, 1982 (age 44) Moose Jaw, Saskatchewan, Canada
- Height: 6 ft 2 in (188 cm)
- Weight: 196 lb (89 kg; 14 st 0 lb)
- Position: Goaltender
- Caught: Left
- Played for: Philadelphia Phantoms; Bridgeport Sound Tigers; Neftekhimik Nizhnekamsk; Wilkes-Barre/Scranton Penguins; Adirondack Phantoms; Växjö Lakers; Springfield Falcons
- NHL draft: Undrafted
- Playing career: 2006–2015

Scott Munroe (born January 20, 1982) is a Canadian former professional ice hockey goaltender who predominantly played in the American Hockey League (AHL). He is currently serving as an assistant coach with Trinity College.

== Playing career ==
Munroe played NCAA Division I hockey at the University of Alabama in Huntsville from 2002 to 2006. Playing in 99 games for the Chargers, Munroe is the all-time career save percentage leader (.918) for UAH. Munroe also holds UAH season records for games played (31), most minutes (1812:54), most shots faced (1,084), and most saves (993). He also holds the Chargers' single-period record for saves and shots faced, stopping 33 of 34 shots against the University of Minnesota on Nov. 2, 2003.

Munroe earned College Hockey America co-Player of the Year honors following his senior year. He also earned CHA Rookie of the Year honors for his play as a freshman. Munroe signed with the Philadelphia Flyers on April 16, 2006.

On April 24, 2008, Munroe was the winning goaltender in the longest AHL game ever played. It was Game 5 of the East Division Semifinals where the Philadelphia Phantoms faced the Albany River Rats at Times Union Center in Albany. The game lasted 142:58 and ended in the fifth overtime, where the Phantoms won 3–2. Munroe had 65 stops in the victory while the losing goaltender, Michael Leighton, had 98 saves.

On July 1, 2009, he signed a one-year deal with the New York Islanders.

In the summer of 2011, he signed a one-year two-way deal with the Pittsburgh Penguins. The following off-season, on August 23, 2012, he signed a one-year AHL deal with the Adirondack Phantoms.

On June 17, 2013, Munroe signed a one-year contract with the Växjö Lakers of the Swedish Hockey League (SHL). On April 16, 2014, Växjö announced that they will not renew Munroe's contract.

After a year in the SHL, Munroe signed for his final professional season to an AHL/ECHL two-way contract with the Springfield Falcons in the 2014–15 campaign.

== Post-retirement ==
On June 30, 2015, Munroe announced his retirement from professional hockey in serving as an assistant coach and goaltending co-ordinator with major junior team, the Moncton Wildcats of the Quebec Major Junior Hockey League.

After two seasons with the Wildcats, Munroe left the team and continued his coaching career by accepting an assistant role with NCAA Division III participant, Trinity College of Connecticut for the 2017–18 season.

== Career statistics ==
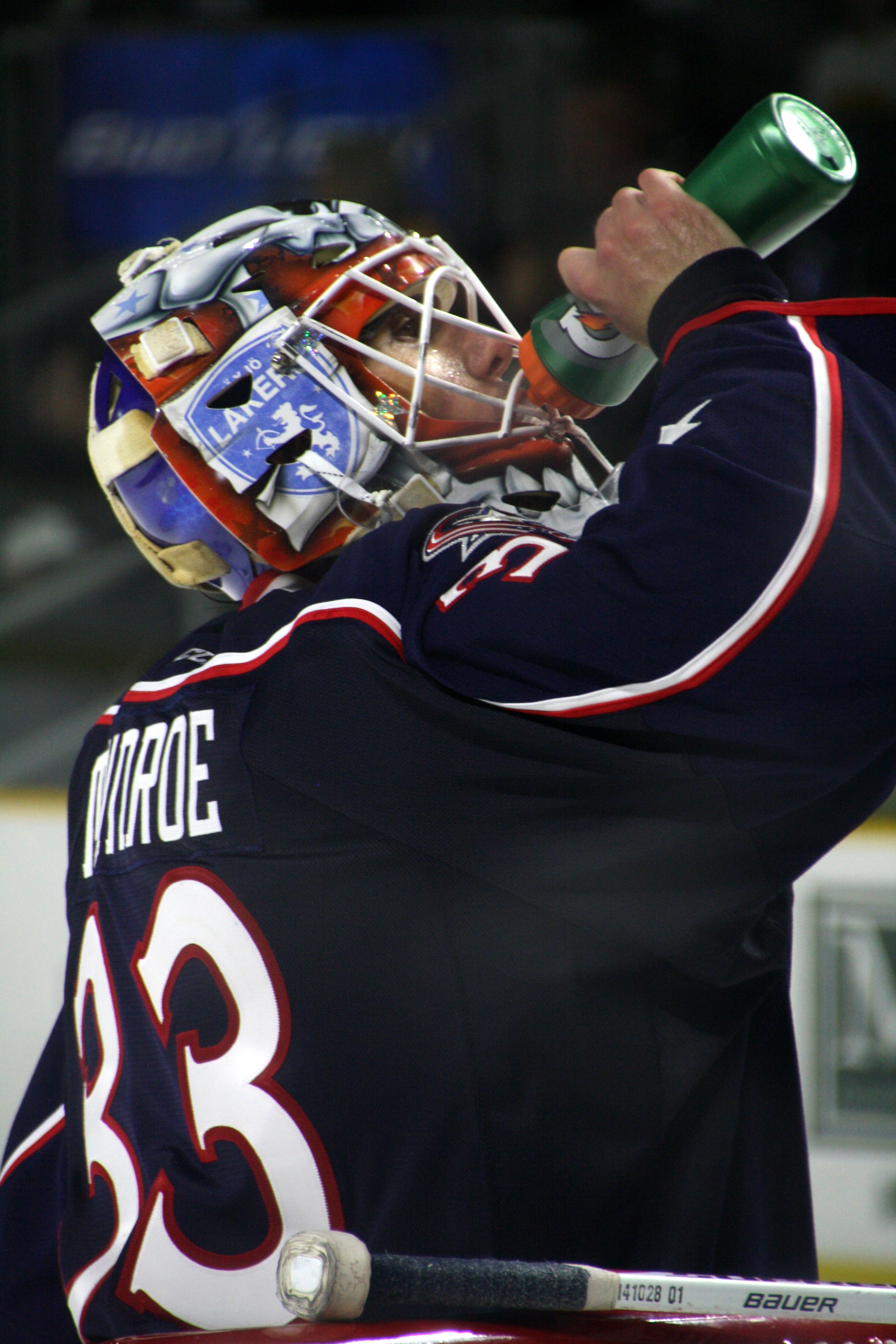
Munroe during his tenure with the Springfield Falcons in 2014.

			Regular season									Playoffs
Season	Team	League	GP	W	L	OT	MIN	GA	SO	GAA	SV%	GP	W	L	MIN	GA	SO	GAA	SV%
2000–01	Notre Dame Hounds	SJHL	25	—	—	—	—	—	—	4.06	.887	—	—	—	—	—	—	—	—
2001–02	Notre Dame Hounds	SJHL	45	—	—	—	—	—	—	2.27	.916	—	—	—	—	—	—	—	—
2002–03	Alabama-Huntsville Chargers	CHA	20	11	6	2	1049	49	1	2.80	.917	—	—	—	—	—	—	—	—
2003–04	Alabama-Huntsville Chargers	CHA	17	5	9	1	891	47	0	3.16	.903	—	—	—	—	—	—	—	—
2004–05	Alabama-Huntsville Chargers	CHA	31	16	10	4	1805	69	3	2.29	.930	—	—	—	—	—	—	—	—
2005–06	Alabama-Huntsville Chargers	CHA	31	17	11	2	1813	91	0	3.01	.916	—	—	—	—	—	—	—	—
2005–06	Philadelphia Phantoms	AHL	2	0	2	0	119	7	0	3.54	.901	—	—	—	—	—	—	—	—
2006–07	Philadelphia Phantoms	AHL	40	15	19	2	2298	117	2	3.05	.908	—	—	—	—	—	—	—	—
2007–08	Philadelphia Phantoms	AHL	36	18	8	2	1779	68	4	2.29	.918	12	5	7	784	29	2	2.22	.921
2008–09	Philadelphia Phantoms	AHL	56	31	19	4	3271	134	4	2.46	.926	3	0	3	180	12	0	4.01	.867
2009–10	Bridgeport Sound Tigers	AHL	40	19	16	3	2310	97	3	2.52	.920	3	0	3	110	10	0	5.46	.825
2010–11	Neftekhimik Nizhnekamsk	KHL	31	9	12	3	1366	69	1	3.03	.896	1	0	1	47	4	0	5.08	.862
2011–12	Wilkes-Barre/Scranton Penguins	AHL	38	19	10	3	2024	85	5	2.52	.907	1	0	0	4	0	0	0.00	1.000
2012–13	Adirondack Phantoms	AHL	31	12	16	0	1745	81	1	2.78	.913	—	—	—	—	—	—	—	—
2013–14	Växjö Lakers	SHL	36	19	16	0	2108	72	3	2.05	.913	1	0	0	33	3	0	5.41	.800
2014–15	Kalamazoo Wings	ECHL	7	5	0	1	403	17	0	2.53	.910	—	—	—	—	—	—	—	—
2014–15	Springfield Falcons	AHL	27	11	11	2	1544	63	2	2.45	.912	—	—	—	—	—	—	—	—
AHL totals			270	125	101	16	15090	652	21	2.59	.916	19	5	13	1078	51	2	2.84	.901

== Awards and honours ==
Award	Year
College
All-CHA Rookie Team	2002–03
All-CHA Second Team	2002–03
All-CHA First Team	2004–05
All-CHA First Team	2005–06

Awards and achievements
Preceded by Riley Riddell	CHA Rookie of the Year; 2002-03	Succeeded by Luke Erickson
Preceded by Andrew Murray	CHA Player of the Year; 2005-06; Shared With; Jeff Van Nynatten	Succeeded by Sean Bentivoglio
