= Andrew Murray (ice hockey) =

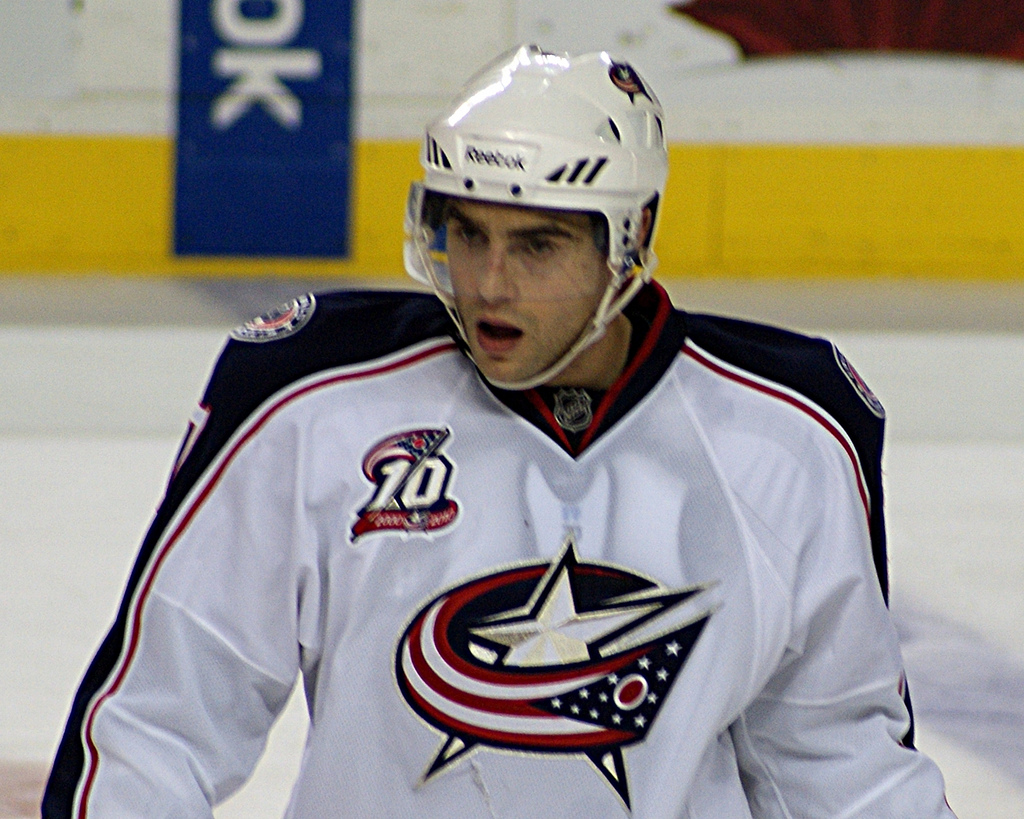
- Born: November 6, 1981 (age 44) Selkirk, Manitoba, Canada
- Height: 6 ft 2 in (188 cm)
- Weight: 210 lb (95 kg; 15 st 0 lb)
- Position: Centre
- Shot: Left
- Played for: Columbus Blue Jackets; San Jose Sharks; St. Louis Blues; KHL Medveščak Zagreb
- National team: Croatia
- NHL draft: 242nd overall, 2001; Columbus Blue Jackets
- Playing career: 2005–2015

Andrew Murray (born November 6, 1981) is a Canadian-Croatian former professional ice hockey player who played in the National Hockey League (NHL). He ended his professional career playing two seasons for KHL Medveščak Zagreb of the Kontinental Hockey League (KHL).

== Playing career ==
Murray played college hockey for Bemidji State University for four seasons under head coach Tom Serratore where he was a three time captain and a 2005 graduate. Andrew left the program as its Division I-era scoring leader with 46-69—115 points in 128 contests ranking him seventh on the College Hockey America (CHA) career list and 30th on BSU's all-time scoring chart. His 46 goals seat him in fourth among BSU's D-I goal-scoring leaders while his 69 assists is tied for BSU Division I-era best.

He was recalled by the Columbus Blue Jackets on December 27, 2007, to play his first NHL game. He scored his first NHL goal on January 2, 2008, against Jean-Sébastien Giguère of the Anaheim Ducks. The Columbus Blue Jackets re-signed Murray to a three-year, one-way contract on March 7, 2008. The deal ran through the 2010–11 season.

On July 13, 2011, Murray was signed to a one-year, two-way contract by the San Jose Sharks.

On February 6, 2012, the San Jose Sharks placed Murray on waivers, and he was sent down to the Worcester Sharks after he cleared waivers on February 7, 2012.

On June 10, 2012, Murray's negotiation rights were traded to the Detroit Red Wings with a conditional draft pick for 2014 as part of a trade deal for Brad Stuart. The Red Wings decided to not keep Murray.

On July 6, 2012, it was announced that Murray had been signed to a one-year, two-way deal with the St. Louis Blues. With the NHL lock-out coming to affect, Murray was assigned directly by the Blues to AHL affiliate, the Peoria Rivermen. During the duration of the 2012–13 season, Murray scored 14 goals and 31 points in 51 games. He was recalled by St. Louis and played a solitary game in a 3–0 defeat to the Chicago Blackhawks on February 28, 2013.

On July 29, 2013, Murray signed his first contract abroad with a one-year contract with KHL Medveščak Zagreb from Croatia, the newest member of Kontinental Hockey League.

== Career statistics ==
=== Regular season and playoffs ===
			Regular season					Playoffs
Season	Team	League	GP	G	A	Pts	PIM	GP	G	A	Pts	PIM
1998–99	Selkirk Steelers	MJHL	61	10	30	40	24	—	—	—	—	—
1999–00	Selkirk Steelers	MJHL	63	29	48	77	57	—	—	—	—	—
2000–01	Selkirk Steelers	MJHL	64	46	56	102	72	5	3	0	3	6
2001–02	Bemidji State University	CHA	35	15	15	30	22	—	—	—	—	—
2002–03	Bemidji State University	CHA	36	9	18	27	38	—	—	—	—	—
2003–04	Bemidji State University	CHA	25	6	14	20	41	—	—	—	—	—
2004–05	Bemidji State University	CHA	31	16	22	38	30	—	—	—	—	—
2005–06	Syracuse Crunch	AHL	77	13	16	29	73	6	0	1	1	17
2006–07	Syracuse Crunch	AHL	72	10	12	22	62	—	—	—	—	—
2007–08	Syracuse Crunch	AHL	34	13	2	15	15	—	—	—	—	—
2007–08	Columbus Blue Jackets	NHL	39	6	4	10	12	—	—	—	—	—
2008–09	Columbus Blue Jackets	NHL	67	8	3	11	10	—	—	—	—	—
2009–10	Columbus Blue Jackets	NHL	46	5	2	7	6	—	—	—	—	—
2010–11	Columbus Blue Jackets	NHL	29	4	4	8	4	—	—	—	—	—
2011–12	San Jose Sharks	NHL	39	1	3	4	4	—	—	—	—	—
2011–12	Worcester Sharks	AHL	10	2	1	3	0	—	—	—	—	—
2012–13	Peoria Rivermen	AHL	51	14	17	31	18	—	—	—	—	—
2012–13	St. Louis Blues	NHL	1	0	0	0	0	—	—	—	—	—
2013–14	KHL Medveščak Zagreb	KHL	54	3	3	6	28	3	0	1	1	0
2014–15	KHL Medveščak Zagreb	KHL	51	3	4	7	14	—	—	—	—	—
2014–15	KHL Medveščak Zagreb II	CRO	—	—	—	—	—	3	3	8	11	0
MJHL totals			188	85	134	219	153	5	3	0	3	6
CHA totals			127	46	69	115	131	—	—	—	—	—
AHL totals			244	52	48	100	168	6	0	1	1	17
NHL totals			221	24	16	40	36	—	—	—	—	—
KHL totals			105	6	7	13	42	3	0	1	1	0

=== International ===
Year	Team	Event	Result	GP	G	A	Pts	PIM
2015	Croatia	WC D1B	16th	5	3	5	8	4
Senior totals				5	3	5	8	4

== Awards and honours ==
Award	Year
MJHL First All-Star Team	2001
All-CHA Rookie Team	2001–02
All-CHA First Team	2004–05

Awards and achievements
Preceded by Barret Ehgoetz; Jared Ross	CHA Player of the Year; 2004-05	Succeeded by Scott Munroe; Jeff Van Nynatten
Preceded by Mike Polidor	CHA Student-Athlete of the Year; 2004-05	Succeeded by Brooks Turnquist
