= Les Reaney =

Canadian ice hockey player (born 1984)

- Born: July 8, 1984 (age 41) Ceylon, Saskatchewan, Canada
- Height: 6 ft 2 in (188 cm)
- Weight: 220 lb (100 kg; 15 st 10 lb)
- Position: Centre
- Shot: Left
- Played for: Stockton Thunder; Dayton Bombers; Rapid City Rush; Wichita Thunder; Edinburgh Capitals; HYS The Hague
- NHL draft: Undrafted
- Playing career: 2008–2014

Les Reaney (born July 8, 1984) is a Canadian former professional ice hockey centre.

== Career ==
Reaney began his career in the ECHL for the Stockton Thunder and the Dayton Bombers before joining the Rapid City Rush of the Central Hockey League. In the 2009-10 season, Reaney scored 86 points for the Rush, 28 goals and 58 assists, and was named into the CHL All-Star team.

In 2012, Reaney moved to the Wichita Thunder of the CHL for one season before moving to Europe. He signed for the Edinburgh Capitals in the United Kingdom's Elite Ice Hockey League the following season, but departed after just seven league games and finished the season in The Netherlands with HYS The Hague. He retired from professional hockey at the conclusion of the season.

In 2022, Reaney became the head coach of the Lake Shores Aces. In 2024, Reaney and team won the Big Thaw tournament with 4 straight wins. This was the teams first Championship, only allowing 3 goals in four games.

== Awards and honours ==
Award	Year
All-CHA Rookie Team	2005–06
All-CHA Second Team	2005–06
All-CHA Second Team	2006–07
CHL All-Star Team	2009–10
CHL All-CHL Team	2009–10

Awards and achievements
Preceded by Stavros Paskaris	CHA Rookie of the Year; 2005-06; Shared With; Ted Cook	Succeeded by Chris Moran
