= Sean Bentivoglio =

Canadian-Italian ice hockey player

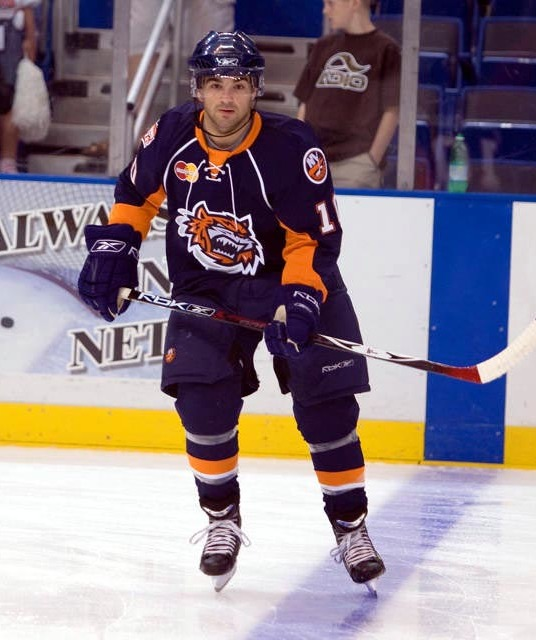
- Bentivoglio with the Bridgeport Sound Tigers in 2007
- Born: October 16, 1985 (age 40) Thorold, Ontario, Canada
- Height: 5 ft 10 in (178 cm)
- Weight: 190 lb (86 kg; 13 st 8 lb)
- Position: Left wing
- Shot: Left
- Played for: New York Islanders; Augsburger Panther; HC Asiago; Cardiff Devils
- NHL draft: Undrafted
- Playing career: 2007–2024

Sean Bentivoglio (born October 16, 1985) is a Canadian-Italian ice hockey forward who currently plays for the Dundas Real McCoys in the Allan Cup Hockey (ACH) league.

== Playing career ==
Bentivoglio was born in Thorold, Ontario. Although he went undrafted, he played four seasons of college hockey at Niagara University in the CHA. During his senior year in 22006–07, while serving as team captain, he was honored as the CHA Player of the Year. After concluding his college career, he turned pro with the Providence Bruins of the AHL, where he made a strong impression by tallying 9 points in 13 playoff games, helping the team advance beyond the first round.

On May 21, 2007, Bentivoglio inked a three-year entry-level deal with the New York Islanders. He spent the 2007–08 season playing for their AHL affiliate, the Bridgeport Sound Tigers. During the 2008–09 season, he equaled his rookie total of 32 points with the Sound Tigers and made his NHL debut with the Islanders on April 2, 2009, in a 5–1 loss to the Montreal Canadiens.

After spending three seasons with the Islanders organization, Sean became a free agent and, on July 22, 2010, agreed to a one-year deal with Augsburger Panther of Germany's DEL.

After concluding his stint with Asiago in the Italian Serie A, Bentivoglio took the next step in his professional career by signing with the Cardiff Devils of the Elite Ice Hockey League (EIHL) in the United Kingdom for the 2016–17 season.

Bentivoglio stayed with the Cardiff team until March 2020, when he officially announced his retirement from professional hockey.

== Career statistics ==
| | | | Regular season | | | | | Playoffs |
| Season | Team | League | GP | G | A | Pts | PIM | GP | G | A | Pts | PIM |
|---|---|---|---|---|---|---|---|---|---|---|---|---|
| 2003–04 | Niagara University | CHA | 39 | 2 | 19 | 21 | 14 | — | — | — | — | — |
| 2004–05 | Niagara University | CHA | 36 | 9 | 18 | 27 | 20 | — | — | — | — | — |
| 2005–06 | Niagara University | CHA | 33 | 16 | 22 | 38 | 55 | — | — | — | — | — |
| 2006–07 | Niagara University | CHA | 37 | 16 | 30 | 46 | 53 | — | — | — | — | — |
| 2006–07 | Providence Bruins | AHL | 15 | 3 | 11 | 14 | 8 | 13 | 3 | 6 | 9 | 14 |
| 2007–08 | Bridgeport Sound Tigers | AHL | 68 | 9 | 23 | 32 | 28 | — | — | — | — | — |
| 2008–09 | Bridgeport Sound Tigers | AHL | 78 | 13 | 19 | 32 | 47 | 4 | 1 | 1 | 2 | 4 |
| 2008–09 | New York Islanders | NHL | 1 | 0 | 0 | 0 | 2 | — | — | — | — | — |
| 2009–10 | Bridgeport Sound Tigers | AHL | 80 | 19 | 26 | 45 | 64 | 5 | 1 | 1 | 2 | 12 |
| 2010–11 | Augsburger Panther | DEL | 40 | 5 | 16 | 21 | 54 | — | — | — | — | — |
| 2011–12 | HC Asiago | ITL | 44 | 15 | 28 | 43 | 82 | 4 | 1 | 2 | 3 | 12 |
| 2012–13 | HC Asiago | ITL | 44 | 23 | 52 | 75 | 72 | 15 | 12 | 24 | 36 | 14 |
| 2013–14 | HC Asiago | ITL | 39 | 26 | 42 | 68 | 34 | 11 | 1 | 5 | 6 | 12 |
| 2014–15 | HC Asiago | ITL | 37 | 16 | 40 | 56 | 64 | 17 | 14 | 11 | 25 | 16 |
| 2015–16 | HC Asiago | ITL | 39 | 19 | 45 | 64 | 49 | 8 | 3 | 7 | 10 | 22 |
| 2016–17 | Cardiff Devils | EIHL | 49 | 18 | 29 | 47 | 24 | 4 | 0 | 2 | 2 | 0 |
| 2017–18 | Cardiff Devils | EIHL | 56 | 14 | 38 | 52 | 71 | 4 | 1 | 2 | 3 | 4 |
| 2018–19 | Cardiff Devils | EIHL | 56 | 16 | 38 | 54 | 52 | 4 | 3 | 3 | 6 | 8 |
| 2019–20 | Cardiff Devils | EIHL | 40 | 1 | 15 | 16 | 24 | — | — | — | — | — |
| NHL totals | | | 1 | 0 | 0 | 0 | 2 | — | — | — | — | — |
| AHL totals | | | 241 | 44 | 79 | 123 | 147 | 22 | 5 | 8 | 13 | 30 |
| Italy totals | | | 203 | 99 | 207 | 306 | 301 | 55 | 31 | 49 | 80 | 76 |
| EIHL totals | | | 201 | 49 | 120 | 169 | 171 | 12 | 4 | 7 | 11 | 12 |

== Awards and honours ==
| Award | Year |
|---|---|
| All-CHA First Team | 2005–06 |
| All-CHA First Team | 2006–07 |
| CHA Player of the Year | 2006–07 |

Awards and achievements
| Preceded by Scott Munroe; Jeff Van Nynatten | CHA Player of the Year; 2006-07 | Succeeded by Ryan Cruthers |
