= Jared Ross =

American former ice hockey center

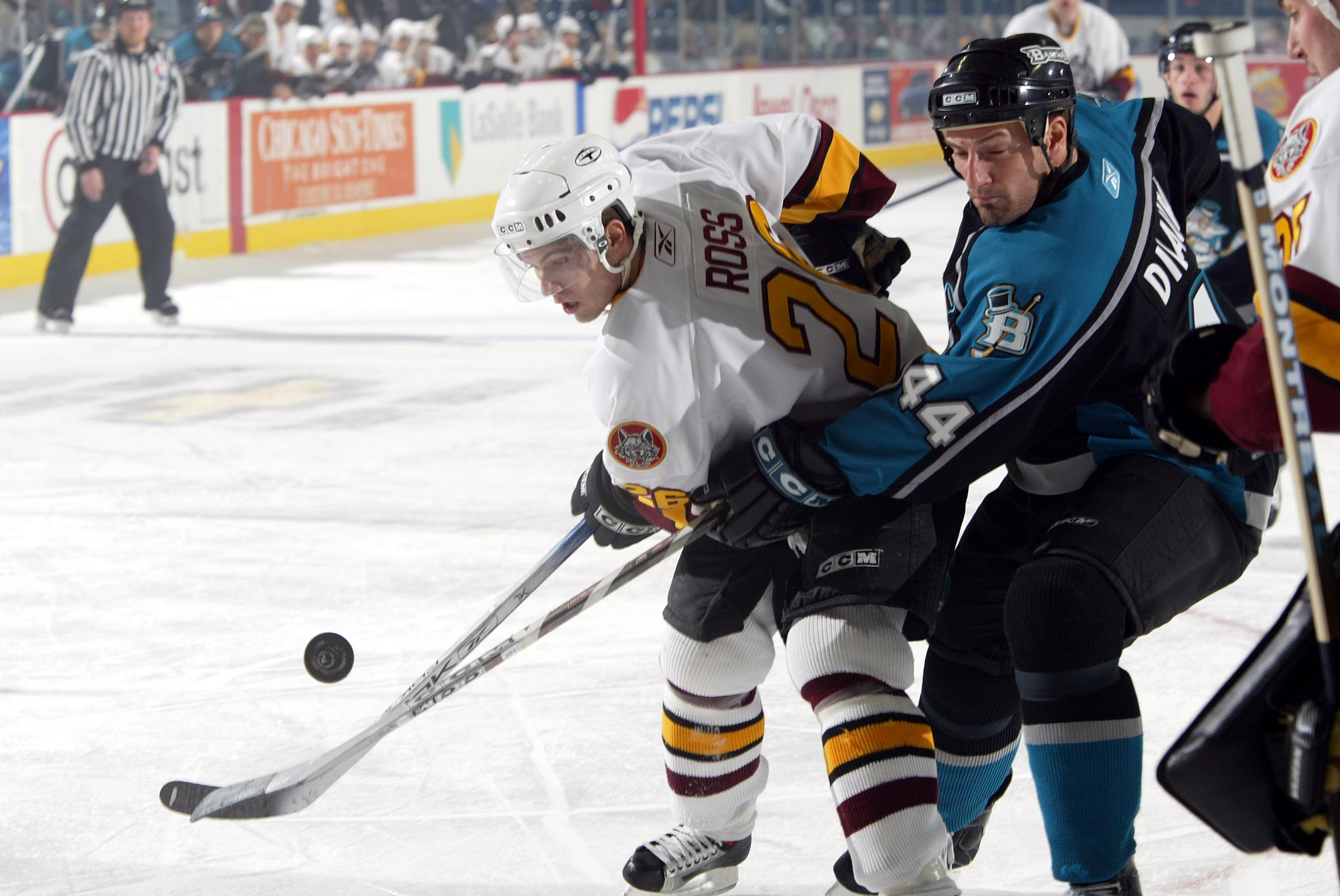
- Ross (left) with the Chicago Wolves in 2006
- Born: September 18, 1982 (age 44) Huntsville, Alabama, U.S.
- Height: 5 ft 9 in (175 cm)
- Weight: 165 lb (75 kg; 11 st 11 lb)
- Position: Center
- Shot: Left
- Played for: Philadelphia Flyers; ERC Ingolstadt
- NHL draft: Undrafted
- Playing career: 2005–2016

Jared Ross (born September 18, 1982) is an American former professional ice hockey center. When he debuted with the Philadelphia Flyers at the beginning of the 2008–09 season, he became the first player born and trained in the state of Alabama to play in the NHL.

== Playing career ==
Ross played high school hockey for Detroit Catholic Central and was a co-winner of the "Mr. Hockey" title in 2001 as the top high school player in the state of Michigan. After spending four years playing collegiate hockey with the Alabama-Huntsville Chargers, Ross made his professional debut with the Motor City Mechanics of the United Hockey League in 2005. He spent most of the next two seasons with the Chicago Wolves of the American Hockey League until being traded to the Philadelphia Phantoms for the loan of Niko Dimitrakos on March 1, 2007. During the 2007–08 season, he led the Phantoms with 62 points, and the Philadelphia Flyers, the Phantoms parent club, signed Ross to a two-way contract on April 8, 2008.

Ross made the Flyers roster out of training camp and made his NHL debut on October 11, 2008 against the New York Rangers. He spent most of the 2008–09 season with the Phantoms, once again leading the team with 69 points and also tying for the team lead with 29 goals. Ross was recalled at the end of the regular season and he played in all six of the team's playoff games against the Pittsburgh Penguins. He scored his first NHL goal in game 3 of the series, beating Marc-Andre Fleury in a 6–3 win on April 19, 2009.

An unrestricted free agent following the 2009–10 season, Ross signed with the Atlanta Thrashers on July 7, 2010.

On April 30, 2011, Ross signed a one-year contract for the 2011–12 season with German team ERC Ingolstadt in the DEL. During the campaign, Ross committed to extend his contract with ERC on February 6, 2012.

== Personal life ==
Ross is the son of former Alabama-Huntsville Chargers head coach Doug Ross.

== Career statistics ==
| | | | Regular season | | | | | Playoffs |
| Season | Team | League | GP | G | A | Pts | PIM | GP | G | A | Pts | PIM |
|---|---|---|---|---|---|---|---|---|---|---|---|---|
| 2001–02 | Alabama-Huntsville Chargers | CHA | 37 | 11 | 17 | 28 | 8 | — | — | — | — | — |
| 2002–03 | Alabama-Huntsville Chargers | CHA | 35 | 20 | 20 | 40 | 30 | — | — | — | — | — |
| 2003–04 | Alabama-Huntsville Chargers | CHA | 31 | 19 | 31 | 50 | 46 | — | — | — | — | — |
| 2004–05 | Alabama-Huntsville Chargers | CHA | 30 | 22 | 18 | 40 | 53 | — | — | — | — | — |
| 2004–05 | Motor City Mechanics | UHL | 12 | 3 | 5 | 8 | 2 | — | — | — | — | — |
| 2005–06 | Chicago Wolves | AHL | 62 | 10 | 27 | 37 | 37 | — | — | — | — | — |
| 2005–06 | Gwinnett Gladiators | ECHL | 1 | 0 | 0 | 0 | 0 | — | — | — | — | — |
| 2006–07 | Chicago Wolves | AHL | 41 | 7 | 8 | 15 | 14 | — | — | — | — | — |
| 2006–07 | Philadelphia Phantoms | AHL | 21 | 4 | 10 | 14 | 6 | — | — | — | — | — |
| 2007–08 | Philadelphia Phantoms | AHL | 67 | 23 | 39 | 62 | 56 | 12 | 5 | 4 | 9 | 4 |
| 2008–09 | Philadelphia Flyers | NHL | 10 | 0 | 0 | 0 | 2 | 6 | 1 | 0 | 1 | 0 |
| 2008–09 | Philadelphia Phantoms | AHL | 64 | 29 | 40 | 69 | 26 | — | — | — | — | — |
| 2009–10 | Adirondack Phantoms | AHL | 73 | 12 | 34 | 46 | 40 | — | — | — | — | — |
| 2009–10 | Philadelphia Flyers | NHL | 3 | 0 | 0 | 0 | 0 | 3 | 0 | 0 | 0 | 0 |
| 2010–11 | Chicago Wolves | AHL | 66 | 15 | 40 | 55 | 38 | — | — | — | — | — |
| 2011–12 | ERC Ingolstadt | DEL | 52 | 23 | 29 | 52 | 24 | 9 | 2 | 6 | 8 | 4 |
| 2012–13 | ERC Ingolstadt | DEL | 51 | 10 | 32 | 42 | 49 | 6 | 0 | 1 | 1 | 2 |
| 2013–14 | ERC Ingolstadt | DEL | 17 | 1 | 10 | 11 | 10 | 17 | 2 | 4 | 6 | 10 |
| 2014–15 | ERC Ingolstadt | DEL | 52 | 16 | 25 | 41 | 34 | 18 | 6 | 4 | 10 | 10 |
| 2015–16 | ERC Ingolstadt | DEL | 52 | 5 | 19 | 24 | 59 | 2 | 0 | 0 | 0 | 0 |
| NHL totals | | | 13 | 0 | 0 | 0 | 2 | 9 | 1 | 0 | 1 | 0 |
| AHL totals | | | 394 | 100 | 198 | 298 | 217 | 12 | 5 | 4 | 9 | 4 |

== Awards and honors ==
| Award | Year |
|---|---|
| All-CHA Rookie Team | 2001–02 |
| All-CHA First Team | 2002–03 |
| All-CHA First Team | 2003–04 |
| All-CHA First Team | 2004–05 |

Awards and achievements
| Preceded by Joe Tallari | CHA Player of the Year; 2003-04; Shared With; Barret Ehgoetz | Succeeded by Andrew Murray |
