= Matt Read =

Canadian ice hockey player (born 1986)

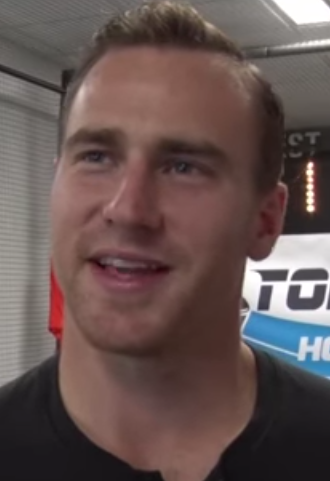
- Read in 2018
- Born: June 14, 1986 (age 40) Ilderton, Ontario, Canada
- Height: 5 ft 10 in (178 cm)
- Weight: 190 lb (86 kg; 13 st 8 lb)
- Position: Right wing
- Shot: Right
- Played for: Philadelphia Flyers; Södertälje SK; Minnesota Wild
- National team: Canada
- NHL draft: Undrafted
- Playing career: 2011–2020

Matthew Zachary Jarrett Read (born June 14, 1986) is a Canadian former professional ice hockey player who played eight seasons in the National Hockey League (NHL). He played for the Philadelphia Flyers, who signed him as an undrafted free agent in 2011, and the Minnesota Wild.

== Playing career ==
=== Minor ===
Read started playing hockey on Vancouver Island playing for the Kerry Park Islanders. At the age of ten, he moved to Colorado Springs, Colorado, and played for Pikes Peak Minor Hockey for four years. He then moved to Ilderton, Ontario, and played for the Ilderton Jets of the OMHA's Shamrock League.

=== Junior/Collegiate ===
After being a finalist in the OMHA Bantam Championship, Read's team won the championship in his first year of midget, with Ilderton defeating Centre Hastings in four games. From minor hockey, Read played OHA Junior D hockey for the Lucan Irish in the 2003–04 season.

In 2004–05, Read signed with the nearby St. Marys Lincolns Junior B club of the Western Ontario Hockey League (WOHL). He spent two seasons with the Lincolns.

In the 2004–05 season, Read was runner up to future NHLer Logan Couture for the WOHL Rookie of the Year Award. Couture, a graduate of the Lucan Irish of the Shamrock League, played that season with the St. Thomas Stars before being an Ontario Hockey League (OHL) first round draft pick in 2005.

The following season, Read signed with the Milton Icehawks Junior A club of the Ontario Junior Hockey League (OJHL) for 2005–06. In 2006–07, Read spent a season with the Des Moines Buccaneers of the United States Hockey League (USHL).

=== Professional ===
Read signed a three-year contract as a free agent with the Philadelphia Flyers on March 24, 2011, after playing four seasons of collegiate hockey with Bemidji State University. Read made the Flyers roster out of training camp heading into the 2011–12 season and made his NHL debut on October 6, 2011, against the Boston Bruins. He scored his first NHL goal on October 8 against Martin Brodeur of the New Jersey Devils. On October 18, Read recorded a career-high four points (one goal and three assists) in a 7–2 Flyers win over the Ottawa Senators. Read participated in the All-Star SuperSkills Competition and finished second in the accuracy contest, behind Dallas Stars forward Jamie Benn. Read finished the regular season leading all NHL rookies in goals scored, 24, and ranking fourth among all rookies in points, 47.

During the 2012–13 NHL lock-out, Read moved overseas to Europe to play for Södertälje SK of the Allsvenskan, Sweden's second-tier hockey league. He recorded 24 points in 20 games.

Shortly after play resumed to begin the 2012–13 season in January, Read scored his first career NHL hat-trick on January 26, 2013, against the Florida Panthers, scoring on goaltenders José Théodore and Scott Clemmensen. Following the shortened season, Read was invited to play for Team Canada at the 2013 IIHF World Championships.

On September 20, 2013, Read signed a four-year, $14.5 million contract extension with the Flyers.

On October 8, 2015, Read scored the first goal of the 2015–16 season for the Flyers in the season opener against the Tampa Bay Lightning.

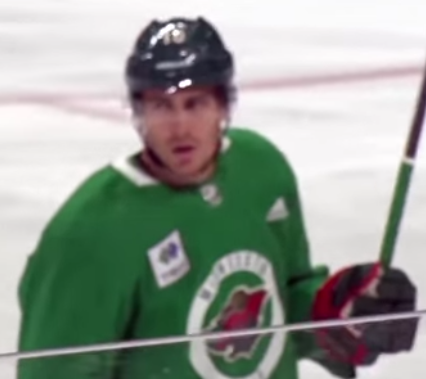
Read in 2018

On July 30, 2018, Read signed a one-year, two way contract with the Minnesota Wild.

On August 2, 2019, as a free agent from the Wild, Read signed a professional tryout contract (PTO) with the Toronto Maple Leafs. After participating in training camp and the pre-season he was signed to a one-year AHL contract with affiliate, the Toronto Marlies, on September 30, 2019.

== Personal life ==
In July 2014, Read married his longtime girlfriend, Erin Cody. On March 17, 2015, they gave birth to their first child, a daughter.

== Career statistics ==
=== Regular season and playoffs ===
			Regular season					Playoffs
Season	Team	League	GP	G	A	Pts	PIM	GP	G	A	Pts	PIM
2002–03	Lucan Irish	OHAJDL	31	22	27	49	36	—	—	—	—	—
2003–04	St. Marys Lincolns	WOHL	36	12	13	25	32	—	—	—	—	—
2004–05	St. Marys Lincolns	WOHL	47	23	29	52	46	—	—	—	—	—
2005–06	Milton Icehawks	OPJHL	48	34	34	68	52	—	—	—	—	—
2006–07	Des Moines Buccaneers	USHL	58	28	34	62	110	8	2	0	2	6
2007–08	Bemidji State Beavers	CHA	36	9	18	27	37	—	—	—	—	—
2008–09	Bemidji State Beavers	CHA	37	15	25	40	50	—	—	—	—	—
2009–10	Bemidji State Beavers	CHA	37	19	22	41	32	—	—	—	—	—
2010–11	Bemidji State Beavers	WCHA	37	22	13	35	34	—	—	—	—	—
2010–11	Adirondack Phantoms	AHL	11	7	6	13	6	—	—	—	—	—
2011–12	Philadelphia Flyers	NHL	79	24	23	47	12	11	3	2	5	4
2012–13	Södertälje SK	Allsv	20	6	18	24	12	—	—	—	—	—
2012–13	Philadelphia Flyers	NHL	42	11	13	24	2	—	—	—	—	—
2013–14	Philadelphia Flyers	NHL	75	22	18	40	16	7	1	2	3	4
2014–15	Philadelphia Flyers	NHL	80	8	22	30	14	—	—	—	—	—
2015–16	Philadelphia Flyers	NHL	79	11	15	26	27	6	0	0	0	2
2016–17	Philadelphia Flyers	NHL	63	10	9	19	8	—	—	—	—	—
2017–18	Lehigh Valley Phantoms	AHL	33	7	9	16	8	—	—	—	—	—
2017–18	Philadelphia Flyers	NHL	19	1	0	1	2	6	1	1	2	4
2018–19	Iowa Wild	AHL	61	16	21	37	36	10	3	5	8	12
2018–19	Minnesota Wild	NHL	12	1	0	1	2	—	—	—	—	—
2019–20	Toronto Marlies	AHL	48	13	12	25	24	—	—	—	—	—
NHL totals			449	88	100	188	83	30	5	5	10	14

=== International ===
Year	Team	Event	Result	GP	G	A	Pts	PIM
2013	Canada	WC	5th	8	1	2	3	2
2014	Canada	WC	5th	8	2	3	5	2
Senior totals				16	3	5	8	4

== Awards and honours ==
Award	Year
College
All-CHA Rookie Team	2007–08
CHA Rookie of the Year	2007–08
All-CHA First Team	2008–09
NCAA Frozen Four	2008–09
All-CHA First Team	2009–10
CHA Player of the Year	2009–10
AHCA West Second-Team All-American	2009–10

Awards and achievements
Preceded by Chris Moran	CHA Rookie of the Year; 2007-08	Succeeded by Brad Hunt
Preceded by Ted Cook	CHA Most Valuable Player in Tournament; 2009	Succeeded by Cameron Talbot
Preceded by Juliano Pagliero	CHA Player of the Year; 2009-10	Succeeded by Award Discontinued
