= Barret Ehgoetz =

Canadian ice hockey player

- Born: April 16, 1981 (age 44) Kincardine, Ontario, Canada
- Height: 5 ft 9 in (175 cm)
- Weight: 170 lb (77 kg; 12 st 2 lb)
- Position: Centre
- Shot: Left
- ECHL team: Cincinnati Cyclones; Utah Grizzlies
- NHL draft: Undrafted
- Playing career: 2005–2011

Barret Ehgoetz (born April 16, 1981) is a Canadian former professional ice hockey player who is best known for playing for the Cincinnati Cyclones in the ECHL.

== Awards and honours ==
| Award | Year |
|---|---|
| All-CHA Second Team | 2002–03 |
| All-CHA First Team | 2003–04 |
| All-CHA First Team | 2004–05 |

- ECHL Sportsmanship Award (2009–10)

Awards and achievements
| Preceded by Joe Tallari | CHA Player of the Year; 2003–04; Shared With; Jared Ross | Succeeded by Andrew Murray |
