= Vince Rocco =

Canadian-born Italian ice hockey player

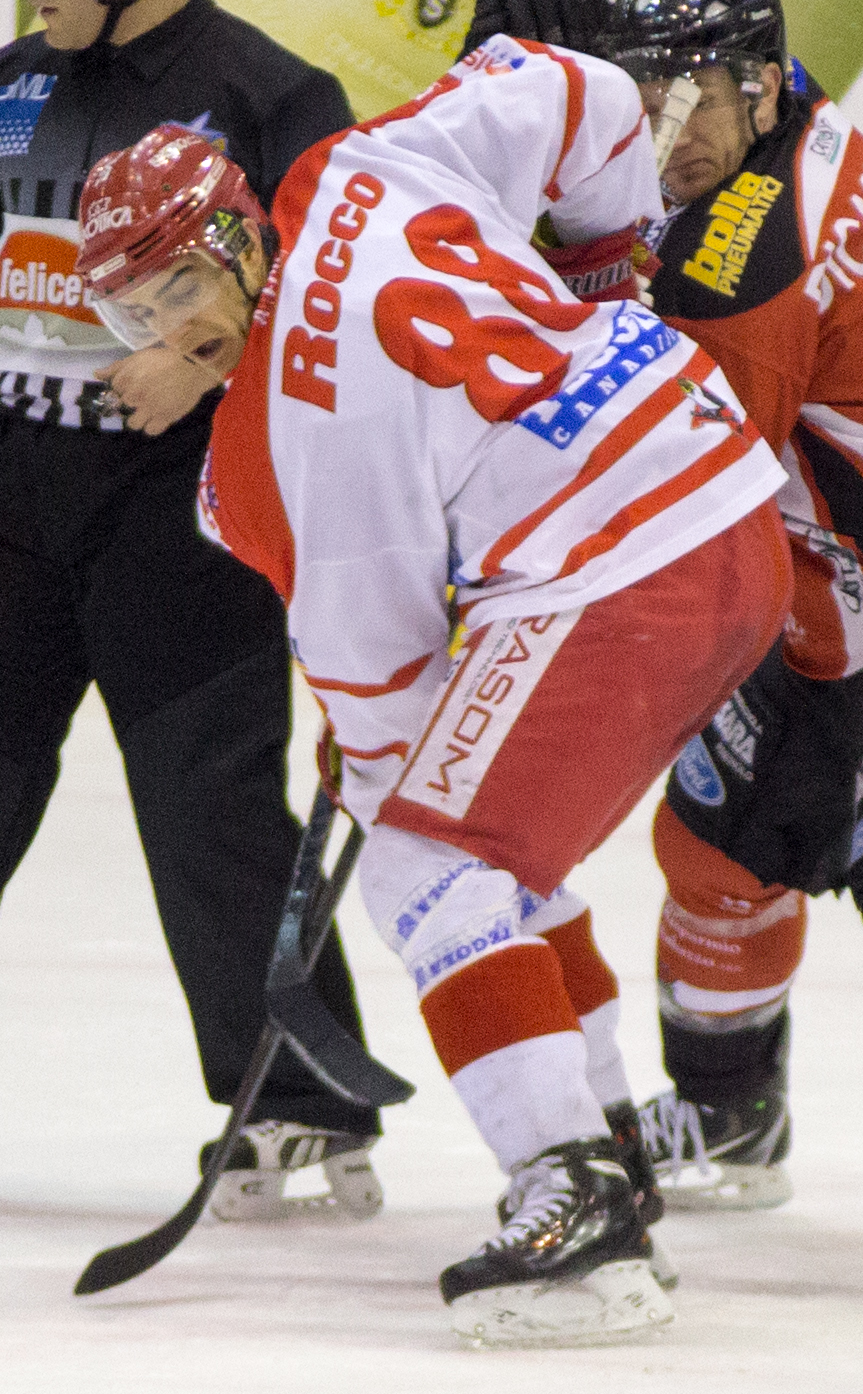
- Coppa Italia 2012-2013, Finale Alleghe-Valpellice IMG 2169 (Vince Rocco)
- Born: June 26, 1987 (age 37); Woodbridge, Ontario, Canada
- Height: 5 ft 10 in (178 cm)
- Weight: 187 lb (85 kg; 13 st 5 lb)
- Position: Forward
- Shoots: Left
- HockeyAllsvenskan team Former teams: IF Troja/Ljungby; ECHL; Reading Royals
- National team: Italy
- NHL draft: Undrafted
- Playing career: 2009–present

Vincent Rocco (born June 26, 1987) is a Canadian-born Italian professional ice hockey player who is currently playing for IF Troja/Ljungby in the Swedish second tier HockeyAllsvenskan ice hockey league, previously playing for Alleghe Hockey in the Italian top tier Serie A.

Prior to turning professional, Rocco attended Niagara University, where he played four seasons with the Niagara Purple Eagles men's ice hockey team which then competed in NCAA's Division I CHA conference. In his third year (2007–08) he was named to the CHA First All-Star Team.

== Awards and honours ==
Award	Year
College
All-CHA First Team	2007–08
All-CHA Second Team	2008–09

Awards and achievements
Preceded by Joel Gasper	CHA Student-Athlete of the Year; 2008-09	Succeeded by Kyle Hardwick
