= Joe Tallari =

Canadian ice hockey player (born 1980)

- Born: October 5, 1980 (age 46) Thunder Bay, Ontario, Canada
- Height: 6 ft 0 in (183 cm)
- Weight: 195 lb (88 kg; 13 st 13 lb)
- Position: Forward
- Shot: Left
- Played for: HC Eppan Pirats Internorm; Bridgeport Sound Tigers; Cleveland Barons; Hartford Wolf Pack; Wheeling Nailers
- NHL draft: Undrafted
- Playing career: 2004–2010

Joe Tallari (born October 5, 1980) is a Canadian former professional ice hockey player.

== Playing career ==
Tallari was born in Thunder Bay, Ontario. In 2001, Tallari began his career playing for Niagara University where he was the team's senior captain. Tallari moved to the Hartford Wolf Pack, the farm team for the New York Rangers. He stayed for just one season before moving to the Johnstown Chiefs of the ECHL, where he topped the 50 point margin.

Over the following three seasons, Tallari switched between teams in the ECHL and the AHL, with stints at the Cleveland Barons, the Bridgeport Sound Tigers (on two occasions) and the Las Vegas Wranglers. He then moved to Europe, signing with the Manchester Phoenix in the summer of 2007 to play under Tony Hand. Tallari had an outstanding season in Manchester, finishing as the EIHL's second highest goal scorer, managing 55 goals and 38 assists in 59 games. This performance won Tallari the 'Best Newcomer' award at the 2008 Man of Ice Awards and ensured his selection for the 2007-08 EIHL All-Star team.

In April 2008 it was announced that Tallari would leave Manchester to sign for the Hockey Club Pustertal-Val Pusteria to try to qualify for the Italian national team. On 7 May 2009 he left Hockey Club Pustertal-Val Pusteria and signed a contract with HC Eppan Pirats Internorm. Tallari led the league with 36 goals during the regular season, and led Eppan-Appiano to the Serie B Championship.

Tallari came out of retirement during the 2010-11 ECHL season and played one game with the Wheeling Nailers. He was released on February 19, 2011.

== Awards and honours ==
Award	Year
All-CHA First Team	2002–03
All-CHA Second Team	2003–04

Awards and achievements
Preceded by David Guerrera	CHA Player of the Year; 2002-03	Succeeded by Barret Ehgoetz; Jared Ross
