= Stavros Paskaris =

American ice hockey player (born 1984)

- Born: August 31, 1984 (age 42) Dearborn, Michigan, U.S.
- Height: 6 ft 1 in (185 cm)
- Weight: 192 lb (87 kg; 13 st 10 lb)
- Position: Forward
- Shot: Right
- Played for: NCAA; Wayne State University; ECHL; Dayton Bombers
- NHL draft: Undrafted
- Playing career: 2008–2008

Stavros Paskaris
Biographical details
- Education: Wayne State University

Coaching career (HC unless noted)
- 2008–2009: Ohio (assistant)
- 2009–2014: Adrian (assistant)
- 2014–2020: Princeton (assistant)
- 2020–2021: Dartmouth (assistant)
- 2021–2025: Bowling Green (assistant)

Stavros Paskaris (born August 31, 1984) is an American former ice hockey player. Paskaris attended Wayne State University where he played four years with the Wayne State Warriors men's ice hockey team which then competed in the NCAA's Division I College Hockey America (CHA) conference. In his final year (2007–08) Paskaris was named to the CHA First All-Star Team.

On July 6, 2020, Paskaris was named assistant coach for the Dartmouth College Big Green, rounding out new head coach Reid Cashman's inaugural staff.

== Awards and honors ==
| Award | Year |
|---|---|
College
| All-CHA Rookie Team | 2004–05 |
| All-CHA First Team | 2007–08 |

Awards and achievements
| Preceded by Luke Erickson | CHA Rookie of the Year; 2004-05 | Succeeded by Les Reaney; Ted Cook |
