= CHA Student-Athlete of the Year =

- Sport: Ice hockey
- Awarded for: The Student-Athlete of the Year in the CHA

History
- First award: 2000
- Final award: 2010
- Most recent: Kyle Hardwick

The CHA Student-Athlete of the Year was an annual award given out at the conclusion of the College Hockey America regular season to the top academic player in the conference as voted by the coaches of each CHA team.

The Player of the Year was first awarded in 2000 and every year thereafter until 2010 when the CHA was disbanded when they could no longer retain their automatic bid to the NCAA Tournament.

== Award winners ==
Year	Winner	Position	School
1999–00	Jay Woodcroft	Center	Alabama-Huntsville
2000–01	Scott Bradley	Forward	Air Force
2001–02	Brian Gornick	Center	Air Force
2002–03	Jason Maxwell	Center	Findlay
2003–04	Mike Polidor	Goaltender	Air Force
2004–05	Andrew Murray	Center	Bemidji State
2005–06	Brooks Turnquist	Defenceman	Air Force
2006–07	Shaun Arvai	Defenceman	Alabama-Huntsville
2007–08	Joel Gasper	Center	Robert Morris
2008–09	Vince Rocco	Right wing	Niagara
2009–10	Kyle Hardwick	Defenceman	Bemidji State

=== Winners by school ===
School	Winners
Air Force	4
Alabama-Huntsville	2
Bemidji State	2
Findlay	1
Niagara	1
Robert Morris	1

=== Winners by position ===
Position	Winners
Center	5
Right wing	1
Left wing	0
Forward	1
Defenceman	3
Goaltender	1

== See also ==
- CHA Awards
