= Denny Urban =

American ice hockey player (born 1988)

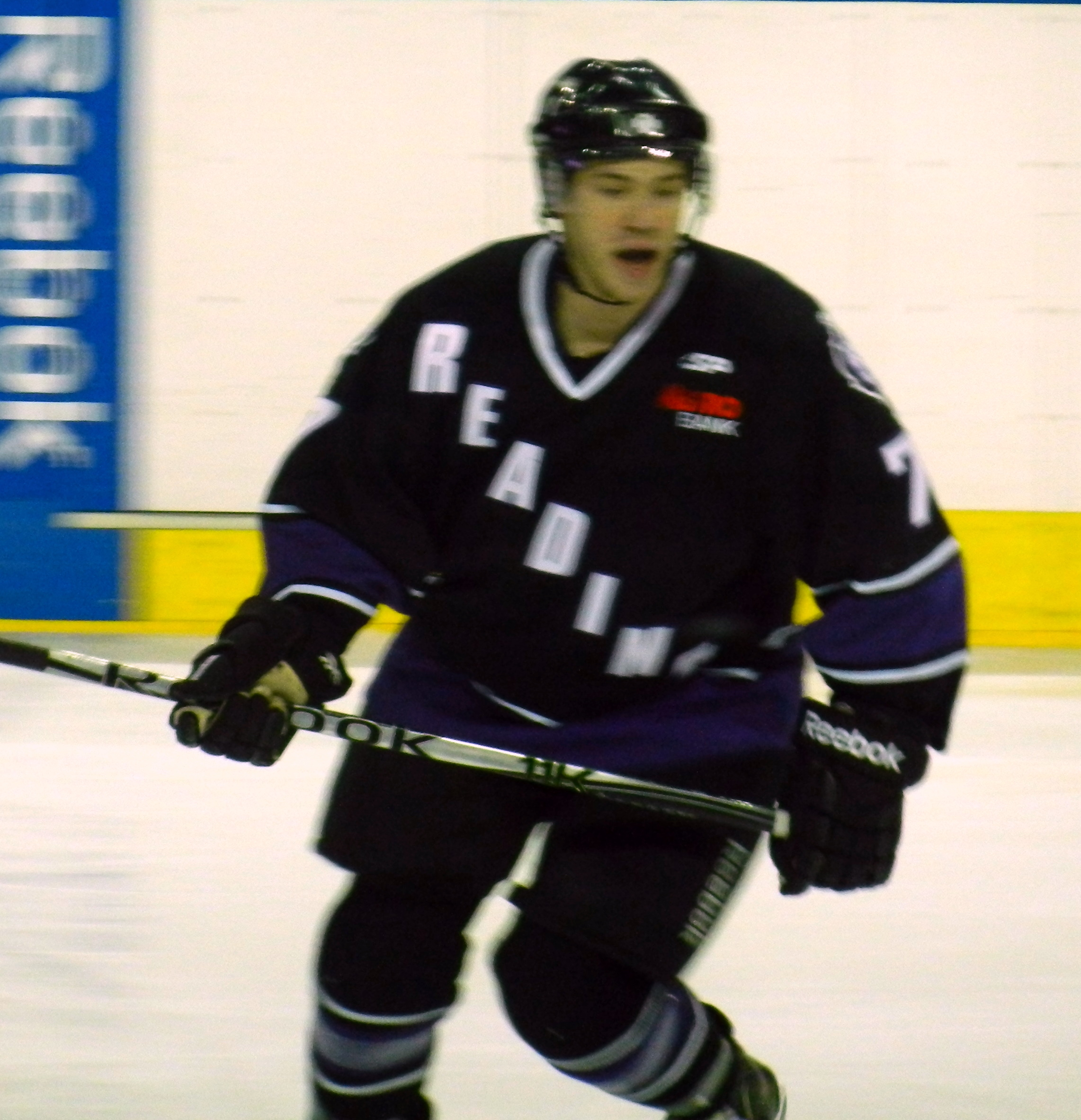
- Born: June 28, 1988 (age 37); Pittsburgh, Pennsylvania, U.S.
- Height: 5 ft 10 in (178 cm)
- Weight: 170 lb (77 kg; 12 st 2 lb)
- Position: Defense
- Shoots: Right
- DEL team Former teams: Straubing Tigers; Worcester Sharks; San Antonio Rampage; Springfield Falcons
- NHL draft: Undrafted
- Playing career: 2011–present

Dennis "Denny" Urban (born June 28, 1988) is an American professional ice hockey player who is currently playing for the Straubing Tigers of the Deutsche Eishockey Liga (DEL).

== Playing career ==
During the 2012–13 season while in his third season with the Reading Royals in the ECHL. Urban made his AHL debut with the Worcester Sharks. On February 1, 2013, he was signed for the remainder of the campaign with Worcester and contributed with 17 points in 36 games from the Blueline.

On July 16, 2013, Urban was signed as a free agent by the San Antonio Rampage to a one-year contract. In the 2013–14 season, Urban appeared in 30 games with the Rampage for just 8 assists before he was traded to fellow AHL club, the Springfield Falcons, in exchange for Tim Miller on February 20, 2014.

On July 14, 2015, Urban left the North American minor leagues to sign his first contract abroad with German club, Straubing Tigers of the DEL.

== Career statistics ==
			Regular season					Playoffs
Season	Team	League	GP	G	A	Pts	PIM	GP	G	A	Pts	PIM
2005–06	Mahoning Valley Phantoms	NAHL	57	13	17	30	88	—	—	—	—	—
2006–07	Omaha Lancers	USHL	21	4	6	10	22	—	—	—	—	—
2006–07	Ohio Junior Blue Jackets	USHL	21	4	4	8	26	4	0	0	0	2
2007–08	Robert Morris University	CHA	30	6	15	21	37	—	—	—	—	—
2008–09	Robert Morris University	CHA	36	4	23	27	34	—	—	—	—	—
2009–10	Robert Morris University	CHA	35	10	14	24	28	—	—	—	—	—
2010–11	Robert Morris University	CHA	35	8	32	40	38	—	—	—	—	—
2010–11	Reading Royals	ECHL	14	3	6	9	4	6	0	0	0	2
2011–12	Reading Royals	ECHL	68	10	39	52	25	5	1	1	2	2
2012–13	Reading Royals	ECHL	31	13	13	26	10	—	—	—	—	—
2012–13	Worcester Sharks	AHL	36	4	13	17	10	—	—	—	—	—
2013–14	San Antonio Rampage	AHL	30	0	8	8	10	—	—	—	—	—
2013–14	Springfield Falcons	AHL	13	2	9	11	0	—	—	—	—	—
2014–15	Springfield Falcons	AHL	31	2	9	11	12	—	—	—	—	—
2014–15	Kalamazoo Wings	ECHL	9	0	4	4	4	4	0	3	3	0
AHL totals			110	8	39	47	32	—	—	—	—	—

== Awards and honors ==
Award	Year
All-CHA Rookie Team	2007–08
All-CHA First Team	2008–09
All-CHA First Team	2009–10
All-Atlantic Hockey First Team	2010–11

Awards and achievements
Preceded by Dan Ringwald	Atlantic Hockey Best Defenseman; 2010-11	Succeeded by Tim Kirby
