= NCAA Division I men's ice hockey tournament all-time team records =

This is a list of NCAA men's Division I ice hockey tournament all-time records, updated through the 2025 tournament.

School	Conference	Games	Wins	Losses	Ties	Winning pct.	Championships
Air Force	AHA	10	3	7	0	.300	0
Alabama–Huntsville	n/a	2	0	2	0	.000	0
Alaska*	Independent	0	0	0	0	–	0
Alaska Anchorage	Independent	7	2	5	0	.286	0
American International	AHA	4	1	3	0	.250	0
Arizona State	NCHC	1	0	1	0	.000	0
Bemidji State	CCHA	8	3	5	0	.375	0
Bentley	AHA	1	0	1	0	.000	0
Boston College	Hockey East	98	53	45	0	.541	5
Boston University	Hockey East	91	50	41	0	.549	5
Bowling Green	CCHA	22	7	14	1	.341	1
Brown	ECAC Hockey	7	2	5	0	.286	0
Canisius	AHA	2	0	2	0	.000	0
Clarkson	ECAC Hockey	38	13	25	1	.346	0
Colgate	ECAC Hockey	10	3	7	0	.300	0
Colorado College	NCHC	38	18	20	0	.474	2
Connecticut	Hockey East	2	1	1	0	.500	0
Cornell	ECAC Hockey	48	22	26	0	.458	2
Dartmouth	ECAC Hockey	8	4	4	0	.500	0
Denver*	NCHC	72	46	26	0	.639	10
Ferris State	CCHA	10	6	4	0	.600	0
Harvard	ECAC Hockey	52	16	35	1	.317	1
Holy Cross	AHA	3	1	2	0	.333	0
Lake Superior State	CCHA	33	20	12	1	.621	3
Maine	Hockey East	52	30	22	0	.577	2
Massachusetts	Hockey East	14	9	5	0	.643	1
Massachusetts Lowell	Hockey East	18	8	10	0	.444	0
Mercyhurst	AHA	3	0	3	0	.000	0
Merrimack	Hockey East	6	2	4	0	.333	0
Miami	NCHC	20	8	12	0	.400	0
Michigan	Big Ten	92	59	33	0	.641	9
Michigan State	Big Ten	63	31	31	1	.500	3
Michigan Tech	CCHA	28	13	15	0	.464	3
Minnesota	Big Ten	105	62	43	0	.590	5
Minnesota State	CCHA	15	5	10	0	.333	0
Minnesota Duluth	NCHC	44	30	14	0	.682	3
New Hampshire	Hockey East	42	16	26	0	.381	0
Niagara	AHA	5	1	4	0	.200	0
North Dakota	NCHC	82	53	29	0	.646	8
Northeastern	Hockey East	12	3	8	1	.292	0
Northern Michigan	CCHA	20	10	10	0	.500	1
Notre Dame	Big Ten	25	13	12	0	.520	0
Ohio State	Big Ten	16	5	11	0	.313	0
Omaha	NCHC	7	2	5	0	.286	0
Penn State	Big Ten	8	4	4	0	.500	0
Princeton	ECAC Hockey	4	0	4	0	.000	0
Providence	Hockey East	38	17	21	0	.447	1
Quinnipiac	ECAC Hockey	23	13	10	0	.565	1
Rensselaer	ECAC Hockey	17	7	9	1	.441	2
RIT	AHA	7	3	4	0	.429	0
Robert Morris	AHA	1	0	1	0	.000	0
St. Cloud State	NCHC	27	9	18	0	.333	0
St. Lawrence	ECAC Hockey	30	5	25	0	.167	0
Union	ECAC Hockey	11	7	4	0	.636	1
Vermont	Hockey East	10	3	7	0	.300	0
Wayne State	n/a	1	0	1	0	.000	0
Western Michigan	NCHC	14	5	9	0	.357	1
Wisconsin*	Big Ten	67	38	24	1	.611	6
Yale	ECAC Hockey	14	7	7	0	.500	1

*Alaska (2010), Denver (1973) and Wisconsin (1992) had their participations vacated due to NCAA rules violations. The stats here reflect official records.
