= Easton Three-Star Player of the Year =

- Sport: Ice hockey
- Awarded for: The player on each team who receives the most three stars of the game honors in CHA play

History
- First award: 2005
- Final award: 2008
- Most recent: Ryan Cruthers

The Easton Three-Star Player of the Year was an annual award given out at the conclusion of the College Hockey America regular season to the player who finished with the most 'stars-of-the-game' points in CHA play. While each school named a Three-Star Player of the Year, the official CHA winner was the player who had the highest point total amongst all conference teams. points were calculated as 5 for a number one star, 3 for a number two star, and 1 for a number three star. Any player on the game roster was eligible to be star and only games between CHA opponents would be counted towards the Three-Star Player of the Year Standings.

The Easton Three-Star Player of the Year was first awarded in 2005 but was discontinued after 2008. It is the only official individual CHA trophy that was not bestowed each year of the conference's existence.

== Award winners ==
Year	Winner	Position	School
2004–05	Bruce Mulherin	Left wing	Alabama-Huntsville
2005–06	Bruce Mulherin	Left wing	Alabama-Huntsville
2006–07	Ted Cook	Forward	Niagara
2007–08	Ryan Cruthers	Right wing	Robert Morris

=== Winners by school ===
School	Winners
Alabama–Huntsville	2
Niagara	1
Robert Morris	1

=== Winners by position ===
Position	Winners
Center	0
Right wing	1
Left wing	2
Forward	1
Defenceman	0
Goaltender	0

== See also ==
- CHA Awards
