= CHA Player of the Year =

- Sport: Ice hockey
- Awarded for: The Player of the Year in the CHA

History
- First award: 2000
- Final award: 2010
- Most recent: Matt Read

The CHA Player of the Year was an annual award given out at the conclusion of the College Hockey America regular season to the best player in the conference as voted by the coaches of each CHA team.

The Player of the Year was first awarded in 2000 and every year thereafter until 2010 when the CHA was disbanded when they could no longer retain their automatic bid to the NCAA Tournament.

== Award winners ==
Year	Winner	Position	School
1999–00	Greg Gardner	Goaltender	Niagara
2000–01	Marc Kielkucki	Goaltender	Air Force
2001–02	David Guerrera	Goaltender	Wayne State
2002–03	Joe Tallari	Left wing	Niagara
2003–04	Barret Ehgoetz	Center	Niagara
	Jared Ross	Center	Alabama-Huntsville
2004–05	Andrew Murray	Center	Bemidji State
2005–06	Scott Munroe	Goaltender	Alabama-Huntsville
	Jeff Van Nynatten	Goaltender	Niagara
2006–07	Sean Bentivoglio	Center	Niagara
2007–08	Ryan Cruthers	Right wing	Robert Morris
2008–09	Juliano Pagliero	Goaltender	Niagara
2009–10	Matt Read	Center	Bemidji State

=== Winners by school ===
School	Winners
Niagara	6
Alabama-Huntsville	2
Bemidji State	2
Air Force	1
Robert Morris	1
Wayne State	1

=== Winners by position ===
Position	Winners
Center	5
Right wing	1
Left wing	1
Defenceman	0
Goaltender	6

== See also ==
- CHA Awards
