= CHA Rookie of the Year =

College Hockey America award

- Sport: Ice hockey
- Awarded for: The Rookie of the Year in the CHA

History
- First award: 2000
- Final award: 2010
- Most recent: Jordan George

The CHA Rookie of the Year was an annual award given out at the conclusion of the College Hockey America regular season to the best freshman player in the conference as voted by the coaches of each CHA team.

The Rookie of the Year was first awarded in 2000 and every year thereafter until 2010 when the CHA was disbanded when they could no longer retain their automatic bid to the NCAA Tournament.

== Award winners ==
Year	Winner	Position	School
1999–00	Andy Berg	Center	Air Force
2000–01	Kevin Fines	Goaltender	Findlay
2001–02	Riley Riddell	Center	Bemidji State
2002–03	Scott Munroe	Goaltender	Alabama-Huntsville
2003–04	Luke Erickson	Center	Bemidji State
2004–05	Stavros Paskaris	Forward	Wayne State
2005–06	Ted Cook	Forward	Niagara
	Les Reaney	Center	Niagara
2006–07	Chris Moran	Forward	Niagara
2007–08	Matt Read	Center	Bemidji State
2008–09	Brad Hunt	Defenceman	Bemidji State
2009–10	Jordan George	Right wing	Bemidji State

=== Winners by school ===
School	Winners
Bemidji State	5
Niagara	3
Air Force	1
Alabama-Huntsville	1
Findlay	1
Wayne State	1

=== Winners by position ===
Position	Winners
Center	5
Right wing	1
Left wing	0
Forward	3
Defenceman	1
Goaltender	2

== See also ==
- CHA Awards
