= Dan Iliakis =

Canadian ice hockey player

- Born: April 25, 1982 (age 43) Scarborough, Ontario, Canada
- Height: 5 ft 11 in (180 cm)
- Weight: 192 lb (87 kg; 13 st 10 lb)
- Position: Defence
- Shoots: Right
- Swe-1 team Former teams: Örebro HK; SM-liiga; SaiPa; Ässät; Espoo Blues
- NHL draft: Undrafted
- Playing career: 2007–present

Dan Iliakis (born April 25, 1982) is a Canadian professional ice hockey defenceman. He most recently played with Örebro HK of the Swedish HockeyAllsvenskan. Iliakis' mother is Finnish.

Iliakis made his SM-liiga debut playing with SaiPa during the 2007–08 SM-liiga season.
