= Chris Vail =

- Born: Christopher Vail
- Origin: Calgary, Alberta, Canada
- Genres: Indie rock
- Occupations: Sound engineer, musician
- Instruments: Drums, guitar, keyboards, mandolin, vocals
- Formerly of: The Dudes; Vailhalen; Key to the City

Chris Vail is a Canadian musician from Calgary, Alberta.

== Discography ==
=== With Key To The City ===
- 2009: Owls Of Getchü (self-released/Saved By Radio)

=== With Vailhalen ===
- 2005: Pop Violence (Saved By Radio)
- 2004: Becs d'Oiseaux (Saved By Radio)

=== With XL Birdsuit ===
- 2003: Kisses (self-released/Saved By Radio)
- 2002: In Minotaur City (Flood Records)

=== With Shecky Formé ===
- 2001: 11 Objects Lost And Found (compilation) (Catch And Release)
- 2000: 002 (Boonbox)
