= College Hockey America =

College ice hockey conference in the United States

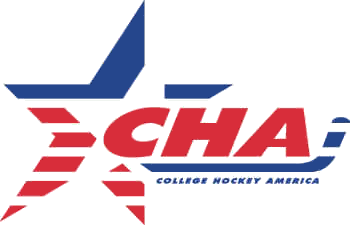
- Association: NCAA
- Founded: 1999 (men's); 2002 (women's)
- Folded: 2010 (men's); 2024 (women's)
- Commissioner: Michelle Morgan (since 2023)
- Sports fielded: Ice hockey
- Division: Division I
- No. of teams: 6
- Headquarters: Boston, Massachusetts, U.S.
- Region: New York, Pennsylvania, Missouri, U.S.
- Website: http://www.chawomenshockey.com

Locations

College Hockey America (CHA) was a college ice hockey conference in the United States. It participated in the NCAA's Division I as a hockey-only conference. The conference's final membership featured six women's teams, with three in Pennsylvania; two in New York, and one in Missouri.

On April 30, 2024, CHA merged with the Atlantic Hockey Association to form Atlantic Hockey America in 2024–25.

== History ==
The CHA was founded as a men's-only league in the 1999–2000 season. The conference was formed by seven teams, three of which were Division I independent teams, another three moving up from Division II, after the NCAA stopped sanctioning Division II hockey in 1998, and one new varsity program (Wayne State).

The newly formed women's division of the CHA began play in the 2002–03 season with four teams. Findlay, Mercyhurst and Wayne State were former Great Lakes Women's Hockey Association members, while Niagara played previously in the ECAC.

The CHA Women's Division managed to remain at four teams between 2002 and 2008; although teams continued to come and go. In 2004, Findlay dropped its women's hockey program and was replaced by Quinnipiac University for one season. In 2005, the Bobcats removed its women's team and moved to another conference (ECAC). They were replaced by the Colonials women's ice hockey team of Robert Morris University. In 2008–09, Syracuse University started up its women's hockey program and joined the conference; bringing the total number of teams in the CHA Women's Division up to five.

The CHA Men's Division folded after the 2009–2010 season, leaving the CHA as a women's-only conference. The fate of the four remaining CHA men's teams was as follows: Niagara and Robert Morris moved to Atlantic Hockey; Bemidji State joined the WCHA; and Alabama-Huntsville continued play as an independent before moving to the WCHA prior to the program being discontinued after the WCHA men's conference folded.

The 2011–12 academic year and season brought many changes to the CHA. Wayne State abruptly ended their women's hockey program, dropping conference membership to only four teams again for the 2011–12 season. The conference announced that Lindenwood University would officially join the CHA for the 2012–2013 season. Lindenwood, then in the process of transitioning its athletic programs from the NAIA to the NCAA, had already been slated to play ten games against CHA opponents in its first season of NCAA competition as an independent program for the 2011–12 season. On March 19, 2012, Niagara announced it was dropping its women's ice hockey program effective immediately; as a result, the Rochester Institute of Technology team was allowed to immediately join the CHA upon its move from D-III to D-I for the 2012–13 season. Penn State, which had announced it would upgrade its men's and women's hockey from club to NCAA Division I status for 2012, was accepted for admission to the CHA for the 2012–13 season. In sum, the CHA continued as a women's-only conference for the 2012–13 season and beyond with a total of six teams consisting of Mercyhurst (original member from 2002); Robert Morris (joined 2005); Syracuse (joined 2008) and new members Penn State, Lindenwood and RIT.

Due to financial impacts related to COVID-19, Robert Morris announced in May 2021 that it would drop its men's and women's hockey teams effective immediately. A subsequent fundraising drive with the goal of reinstating hockey was successful enough that RMU announced that December that it would reinstate both teams effective in 2023–24. RMU applied for readmission to CHA (as well as its previous men's hockey home of Atlantic Hockey), and was officially reinstated to CHA on March 3, 2022.

On June 6, 2023, it was announced that the CHA would be merging with the Atlantic Hockey Association (AHA), with the two conferences operating under one banner by 2024. Although the two conferences had their own governing boards and bylaws, they had a combined conference staff and a single commissioner from 2010 until their merger. The merged league was unveiled as Atlantic Hockey America on April 30, 2024.

== Final members ==
Conference affiliations reflect those at the time CHA's merger with the Atlantic Hockey Association was finalized.

Institution	Location	Nickname	Founded	Affiliation	Enrollment	Joined	Women's conference championships	Men's Hockey conference	Primary Conference	Colors
Lindenwood University	St. Charles, Missouri	Lions	1827	Private/Presbyterian	12,213	2012	0	Independent	OVC	
Mercyhurst University	Erie, Pennsylvania	Lakers	1926	Private/Catholic	4,106	2002	2003, 2004, 2005, 2006, 2007, 2008, 2009, 2010, 2011, 2013, 2016, 2018, 2020	Atlantic Hockey	PSAC (D-II) (Note: Shortly before the merged conference was announced as Atlantic Hockey America, Mercyhurst announced it would start a transition to Division I in July 2024 as a new member of the Northeast Conference.)	
Pennsylvania State University	University Park, Pennsylvania (Note: The entire campus has a University Park mailing address; it has portions in three adjoining communities: State College, College Township, and Ferguson Township. The hockey program operates from College Township.)	Nittany Lions	1855	Public/State-related	44,817	2012	2023	Big Ten	Big Ten	
Robert Morris University	Moon Township, Pennsylvania	Colonials	1921	Private/Nonsectarian	4,895	2005; 2023 (Note: Robert Morris had been a CHA member from 2005–2021, after which it dropped women's hockey. The team resumed play in 2023.)	2012, 2017, 2021	Atlantic Hockey (Note: RMU dropped men's hockey at the same time it dropped the women's team. The men's team also resumed play in 2023, rejoining its former men's home of Atlantic Hockey.)	Horizon League	
Rochester Institute of Technology	Henrietta, New York (Note: The campus has a Rochester mailing address.)	Tigers	1829	Private/Non-sectarian	18,063	2012	2014, 2015	Atlantic Hockey	Liberty League (D-III)	
Syracuse University	Syracuse, New York	Orange	1870	Private/Non-sectarian	19,082	2008	2019, 2022	NECHL (Club)	ACC	

=== Announced future members ===
CHA added one member after the merger was announced, but before it was finalized. This school's membership accordingly transferred to Atlantic Hockey America.

- University of Delaware Fightin' Blue Hens, joining in 2025

=== Former (Women's Division) members ===
- University of Findlay Oilers, 1999–2004 (dropped program)
- Quinnipiac University Bobcats, 2004–2005 (moved to ECAC)
- Wayne State University Warriors, 2002–2011 (dropped program)
- Niagara University Purple Eagles, 2002–2012 (dropped program)

== Conference arenas ==
School	Arena	Capacity
Lindenwood	Centene Community Ice Center	2,500
Mercyhurst	Mercyhurst Ice Center	1,500
Penn State	Pegula Ice Arena	6,000
RIT	Gene Polisseni Center	4,300
Robert Morris	RMU Island Sports Center	1,200
Syracuse	Tennity Ice Skating Pavilion	350

== CHA Tournament (Women's) history ==
Prior to 2013, the CHA tournament was hosted at a predetermined site. From 2013–2015, the two first-round series were each played at the home of the higher seed, with the semifinals and final held at the home of the number one seed. In 2016, the two first round series remained as before, but the semifinals and finals were held at the LECOM Harborcenter in downtown Buffalo, New York. Starting in 2017, the two first-round series were replaced by a pair of single games, allowing all five games of the six-team tournament to be played at the LECOM Harborcenter.

== Champions ==
Year	Winning team	Losing team	Score	Location	Reference
2003	Mercyhurst	Findlay	1–0	Detroit, Michigan	
2004	Mercyhurst	Niagara	3–1	Lewiston, New York	
2005	Mercyhurst	Niagara	4–1	Erie, Pennsylvania	
2006	Mercyhurst	Niagara	6–2	Detroit, Michigan	
2007	Mercyhurst	Wayne State	4–1	Pittsburgh, Pennsylvania	
2008	Mercyhurst	Wayne State	2–1 (OT)	Lewiston, New York	
2009	Mercyhurst	Wayne State	6–1	Erie, Pennsylvania	
2010	Mercyhurst	Syracuse	3–1	Detroit, Michigan	
2011	Mercyhurst	Syracuse	5–4	Syracuse, New York	
2012	Robert Morris	Mercyhurst	3–2	Pittsburgh, Pennsylvania	
2013	Mercyhurst	Syracuse	5–4	Erie, Pennsylvania	
2014	RIT	Mercyhurst	2–1 (2OT)	Erie, Pennsylvania	
2015	RIT	Syracuse	2–1 (2OT)	Erie, Pennsylvania	
2016	Mercyhurst	Syracuse	4–3 (OT)	Buffalo, New York	
2017	Robert Morris	Syracuse	2–0	Buffalo, New York	
2018	Mercyhurst	Syracuse	5–3	Buffalo, New York	
2019	Syracuse	Robert Morris	6–2	Buffalo, New York	
2020	Mercyhurst	Robert Morris	2–1 (OT)	Buffalo, New York	
2021	Robert Morris	Syracuse	1–0	Erie, Pennsylvania	
2022	Syracuse	Mercyhurst	3–2 (OT)	Syracuse, New York	
2023	Penn State	Mercyhurst	2–1 (OT)	State College, Pennsylvania	
2024	Penn State	Mercyhurst	1–0	State College, Pennsylvania	

== NCAA postseason women's hockey history ==
Prior to the 2014–15 season, The CHA did not have an automatic bid to the NCAA tournament for its conference tournament champion. At that time, with membership having remained stable at six teams (Mercyhurst, Robert Morris, Syracuse, Lindenwood, RIT, and Penn State) for two consecutive seasons, the autobid was granted.

In the table below, all NCAA appearances prior to 2015 were at-large selections.

NCAA tournament
Year	CHA Rep.	Opponent	Result
2005	Mercyhurst	Harvard	L 5–4 (3OT)
2006	Mercyhurst	Wisconsin	L 2–1 (2OT)
2007	Mercyhurst	Minnesota Duluth	L 3–2 (OT)
2008	Mercyhurst	Minnesota Duluth	L 5–4
2009	Mercyhurst	St. Lawrence	W 3–1
2009	Mercyhurst	Minnesota	W 5–4 (Frozen Four)
2009	Mercyhurst	Wisconsin	L 5–0 (National Championship)
2010	Mercyhurst	Boston University	W 4–1
2010	Mercyhurst	Cornell	L 3–2 (Frozen Four)
2011	Mercyhurst	Boston University	L 2–4
2012	Mercyhurst	Wisconsin	L 3–1
2013	Mercyhurst	Cornell	W 4–3 (OT)
2013	Mercyhurst	Boston University	L 1–4 (Frozen Four)
2014	Mercyhurst	Cornell	W 3–2
2014	Mercyhurst	Clarkson	L 1–5 (Frozen Four)
2015	RIT	Minnesota	L 2–6
2016	Mercyhurst	Wisconsin	L 0–6
2017	Robert Morris	Wisconsin	L 0–7
2018	Mercyhurst	Clarkson	L 1–2 (OT)
2019	Syracuse	Wisconsin	L 0–4
2020	Canceled		
2021	Robert Morris	Northeastern	L 1–5
2022	Syracuse	Quinnipiac	L 0–4
2023	Penn State	Quinnipiac	L 2–3 (3OT)
2024	Penn State	St. Lawrence	L 0–1 (OT)

== Men's Division history ==
The CHA was founded in 1999 with only a men's division. Three of the seven charter members, Alabama–Huntsville, Bemidji State, and Findlay, had recently moved up from Division II, while Air Force, Army, and Niagara were formerly independent. Wayne State was a charter member, and began sponsoring varsity hockey in 2000.

Niagara went undefeated in conference play in 1999–2000, winning the conference tournament and gaining an at-large invitation to the NCAA tournament. (The conference did not gain an automatic bid until the 2003 tournament.) Army spent only one season in the league before leaving for the MAAC. Findlay dropped its hockey programs following the 2003–2004 season, to be replaced by Robert Morris, which began play in 2004–2005. After Air Force left for Atlantic Hockey in 2006 and Wayne State dropped its program in 2008, the conference was left with only four teams. The CHA sought to add new programs to its men's league, hoping to draw interest from some of the top club teams in the country, including Kennesaw State University. However, these efforts came up short, with CHA and school personnel citing Title IX as a major hurdle in the negotiations.

On January 29, 2009, Niagara University announced that it and Robert Morris University were moving to Atlantic Hockey beginning in the 2010–11 season. Bemidji State applied again to the Western Collegiate Hockey Association for inclusion and was accepted, along with the University of Nebraska-Omaha of the Central Collegiate Hockey Association. Alabama-Huntsville applied to the CCHA following the announced departure of Nebraska-Omaha and was denied. As a result, Alabama-Huntsville began competing as an independent team beginning with the 2010–11 season. The CHA men's division dissolved in 2010.

=== Member schools ===
There were eight member schools in total during the eleven men's seasons. The conference began in the 1999–2000 season with seven teams, and ended in 2009–2010 with four.

Locations of member teams

Institution	Location	Nickname	Membership	Men's championships	Subsequent Conference	Current Conference	Colors
University of Alabama in Huntsville	Huntsville, Alabama	Chargers	1999–2010	2007, 2010	Independent	dropped program	
Bemidji State University	Bemidji, Minnesota	Beavers	1999–2010	2005, 2006, 2009	WCHA	CCHA (Note: This league shares its name with the former CCHA that operated from 1971 to 2013.)	
University of Findlay	Findlay, Ohio	Oilers	1999–2004	–	dropped program		
Niagara University	Lewiston, New York (Note: The campus mailing address is "Niagara University, New York".)	Purple Eagles	1999–2010	2000, 2004, 2008	Atlantic Hockey Association	Atlantic Hockey America	
Robert Morris University	Moon Township, Pennsylvania	Colonials	2004–2010	–	Atlantic Hockey Association	Atlantic Hockey America	
United States Air Force Academy	USAF Academy, Colorado	Falcons	1999–2006	–	Atlantic Hockey Association	Atlantic Hockey America	
United States Military Academy	West Point, New York	Black Knights	1999–2000	–	Atlantic Hockey Association	Atlantic Hockey America	
Wayne State University	Detroit, Michigan	Warriors	1999–2008	2001, 2002, 2003	dropped program		

=== CHA Tournament (Men's Division) ===
Regular season champions were awarded the Bob Peters Cup, and tournament champions were awarded the Bruce M. McLeod Cup. For the first time in conference history, the 2006 men's and women's tournaments were held at the same site: The Michigan State Fairgrounds Coliseum in Detroit, Michigan. The 2008 tournaments were also held jointly, at Dwyer Arena in Lewiston, New York.

Year	(M)Champion	Score	Runner-up	City
2000	Niagara	3–2	Alabama–Huntsville	Huntsville, Alabama
2001	Wayne State	4–1	Alabama–Huntsville	Huntsville, Alabama
2002	Wayne State	5–4 (OT)	Alabama–Huntsville	Lewiston, New York
2003	Wayne State	3–2	Bemidji State	Kearney, Nebraska
2004	Niagara	4–3 (OT)	Bemidji State	Kearney, Nebraska
2005	Bemidji State	3–0	Alabama–Huntsville	Grand Rapids, Minnesota
2006	Bemidji State	4–2	Niagara	Detroit, Michigan
2007	Alabama–Huntsville	5–4 (OT)	Robert Morris	Des Moines, Iowa
2008	Niagara	3–2	Bemidji State	Lewiston, New York
2009	Bemidji State	3–2 (OT)	Robert Morris	Bemidji, Minnesota
2010	Alabama–Huntsville	3–2 (OT)	Niagara	Lewiston, New York

==== NCAA postseason (Men's) hockey history ====
NCAA tournament
Year	CHA Rep.	Opponent	Result
2000	Niagara ^{A}	New Hampshire	W 4–1
2000	Niagara ^{A}	North Dakota	L 4–1
2003	Wayne State	Colorado College	L 4–2
2004	Niagara	Boston College	L 5–2
2005	Bemidji State	Denver	L 4–3 (OT)
2006	Bemidji State	Wisconsin	L 4–0
2007	Alabama–Huntsville	Notre Dame	L 3–2 (2OT)
2008	Niagara	Michigan	L 5–1
2009	Bemidji State	Notre Dame	W 5–1
2009	Bemidji State	Cornell	W 4–1
2009	Bemidji State	Miami (OH)	L 4–1 (Frozen Four)
2010	Alabama–Huntsville	Miami (OH)	L 2–1
2010	Bemidji State ^{A}	Michigan	L 5–1

^AAt-large invitee. College Hockey America was not awarded an automatic bid until 2003.

=== Awards ===
At the conclusion of each regular season schedule the coaches of each CHA team voted which players they choose to be on the three All-Conference teams: first team, second team and rookie team. Additionally they voted to award 4 individual trophies to an eligible player at the same time. The CHA also awarded an 'Easton Three-Star Player of the Year', given to the player with the highest point total with respect to their being named a star of a game, and a Most Valuable Player in Tournament which was voted on at the conclusion of the conference tournament. All awards, with the exception of the Three-Star Player of the Year, were awarded every year of the conference's existence.

==== All-Conference teams ====
Award	Inaugural year
First Team	1999–2000
Second Team	1999–2000
Rookie Team	1999–2000

==== Individual awards ====
Award	Inaugural year
Player of the Year	1999–2000
Rookie of the Year	1999–2000
Coach of the Year	1999–2000
Student-Athlete of the Year	1999–2000
Easton Three-Star Player of the Year	2004–05
Most Valuable Player in Tournament	2000

== See also ==
- NCAA women's ice hockey tournament (National Collegiate division)
