= 2008–09 Alabama–Huntsville Chargers men's ice hockey season =

American college ice hockey team season

2008–09 Alabama–Huntsville Chargers men's ice hockey
- Conference: College Hockey America
- Record: 5–20–5 (3–11–4 CHA)
- Head coach: Danton Cole (2nd season)
- Captain: Scott Kalinchuk
- Alternate captain: Josh Murray, Tom Train
- Home stadium: Von Braun Center

The 2008–09 Alabama–Huntsville Chargers ice hockey team represented the University of Alabama in Huntsville in the 2008–09 NCAA Division I men's ice hockey season. The Chargers were coached by Danton Cole who was in his second season as head coach. The Chargers played their home games in the Von Braun Center and were members of the College Hockey America conference.

== Roster ==
No.	Nat.	Player	Class	Pos	Height	Weight	DoB	Hometown	Previous team
1		Wyatt Russell	Sophomore	G	6' 1" (1.85 m)	180 lb (82 kg)	1986-07-10	Los Angeles, California	Brampton (OJHL)
2		Ryan Burkholder	Sophomore	D	6' 1" (1.85 m)	195 lb (88 kg)	1987-09-01	Newmarket, Ontario	Newmarket (OJHL)
4		Brandon Roshko	Junior	D	5' 9" (1.75 m)	180 lb (82 kg)	1985-08-22	Hamilton, Ontario	Aurora (OJHL)
5		Brennan Barker	Junior	D	6' 1" (1.85 m)	195 lb (88 kg)	1985-07-19	Long Sault, Ontario	Penticton Vees (BCHL)
6		Mike Ward	Sophomore	D	5' 11" (1.8 m)	200 lb (91 kg)	1987-03-04	Strathroy, Ontario	Aurora (OJHL)
7		Jamie Easton	Freshman	F	5' 8" (1.73 m)	165 lb (75 kg)	1988-01-05	Edmonton, Alberta	Bonnyville (AJHL)
8		Clark MacLean	Freshman	F	6' 1" (1.85 m)	175 lb (79 kg)	1987-12-04	Worthington, Ohio	Ohio (USHL)
9		Cody Campbell	Freshman	F	5' 9" (1.75 m)	180 lb (82 kg)	1987-05-21	Maple Ridge, British Columbia	Burnaby (BCHL)
10		Andrew Coburn	Sophomore	F	5' 10" (1.78 m)	185 lb (84 kg)	1986-02-15	Mount Forest, Ontario	Vernon (BCHL)
11		Neil Ruffini	Sophomore	F	5' 10" (1.78 m)	195 lb (88 kg)	1988-03-14	Roswell, Georgia	Proctor Academy (USHS–NH)
12		Josh Murray (A)	Senior	RW	5' 11" (1.8 m)	190 lb (86 kg)	1984-11-11	Terrace, British Columbia	Williams Lake (BCHL)
13		Joey Koudys	Sophomore	F	5' 11" (1.8 m)	185 lb (84 kg)	1988-03-28	Grimsby, Ontario	Thorold (GOJHL)
14		Cale Tanaka	Junior	LW	5' 9" (1.75 m)	180 lb (82 kg)	1986-05-31	Stouffville, Ontario	Aurora (OJHL)
15		Matt Baxter	Sophomore	D	6' 3" (1.91 m)	180 lb (82 kg)	1988-08-04	Courtice, Ontario	Bowmanville (OJHL)
16		Tom Train (A)	Junior	C	6' 1" (1.85 m)	190 lb (86 kg)	1985-02-22	Hurst, Texas	Texas (NAHL)
18		Scott Kalinchuk (C)	Senior	D	6' 1" (1.85 m)	195 lb (88 kg)	1984-11-23	Sylvan Lake, Alberta	Canmore (AJHL)
19		Chris Fairbanks	Sophomore	F	6' 1" (1.85 m)	180 lb (82 kg)	1986-07-15	Milford, Michigan	Youngstown (NAHL)
20		Joe Federoff	Senior	C	6' 2" (1.88 m)	205 lb (93 kg)	1984-08-05	Pittsburgh, Pennsylvania	Robert Morris (NCAA)
21		Derek Conter	Senior	F	6' 2" (1.88 m)	210 lb (95 kg)	1983-06-10	Toronto, Ontario	Wichita Falls (NAHL)
22		Kyle Goodchild	Sophomore	F	6' 2" (1.88 m)	185 lb (84 kg)	1988-10-13	Courtice, Ontario	Bowmanville (OJHL)
24		Tom Durnie	Freshman	D	6' 2" (1.88 m)	195 lb (88 kg)	1988-04-04	Calgary, Alberta	Canmore (AJHL)
25		Kevin Morrison	Junior	LW	6' 1" (1.85 m)	190 lb (86 kg)	1986-04-30	Mississauga, Ontario	Milton (OJHL)
27		Vince Bruni	Sophomore	F	6' 1" (1.85 m)	190 lb (86 kg)	1987-04-08	Toronto, Ontario	Springfield (NAHL)
28		Davide Nicoletti	Junior	D	6' 3" (1.91 m)	210 lb (95 kg)	1986-03-22	Toronto, Ontario	Springfield (NAHL)
29		Blake MacNicol	Junior	G	5' 10" (1.78 m)	175 lb (79 kg)	1986-12-31	Milan, Ohio	Bay State (EJHL)
33		Cameron Talbot	Sophomore	G	6' 3" (1.91 m)	185 lb (84 kg)	1987-06-05	Caledonia, Ontario	Hamilton (OJHL)
55		Matt Sweazey	Senior	C	6' 1" (1.85 m)	195 lb (88 kg)	1984-04-11	Toronto, Ontario	Georgetown (OJHL)

== Regular season ==
=== Schedule ===
Date	Time	Opponent	Site	Decision	Result	Attendance	Record
October 10	8:35 pm	at Colorado College*	Colorado Springs World Arena • Colorado Springs, Colorado	Talbot	L 0–1	5,830	0–1–0 (0–0–0)
October 11	8:05 pm	at Colorado College*	Colorado Springs World Arena • Colorado Springs, Colorado	MacNicol	L 3–5	6,285	0–2–0 (0–0–0)
October 24	7:05 pm	Tennessee*	Von Braun Center • Huntsville, Alabama (Exhibition)	Russell	W 13–0	2,795	0–2–0 (0–0–0)
October 31	6:35 pm	at Robert Morris	84 Lumber Arena • Neville Island, Pennsylvania	Talbot	T 3–3 ^{OT}	890	0–2–1 (0–0–1)
November 1	6:35 pm	at Robert Morris	84 Lumber Arena • Neville Island, Pennsylvania	Talbot	L 2–3	806	0–3–1 (0–1–1)
November 7	7:05 pm	Bemidji State	Von Braun Center • Huntsville, Alabama	MacNicol	W 4–2	3,474	1–3–1 (1–1–1)
November 8	7:05 pm	Bemidji State	Von Braun Center • Huntsville, Alabama	Talbot	L 1–2 ^{OT}	4,368	1–4–1 (1–2–1)
November 21	6:00 pm	at Yale*	Ingalls Rink • New Haven, Connecticut	Talbot	W 1–0	1,845	2–4–1 (1–2–1)
November 22	6:00 pm	at Yale*	Ingalls Rink • New Haven, Connecticut	MacNicol	L 2–6	2,019	2–5–1 (1–2–1)
December 5	7:35 pm	at Bemidji State	John S. Glas Field House • Bemidji, Minnesota	Talbot	L 1–3	1,968	2–6–1 (1–3–1)
December 6	7:05 pm	at Bemidji State	John S. Glas Field House • Bemidji, Minnesota	Talbot	L 2–4	1,896	2–7–1 (1–4–1)
December 12	6:05 pm	at Ferris State*	Robert L. Ewigleben Ice Arena • Big Rapids, Michigan	Talbot	L 2–4	930	2–8–1 (1–4–1)
December 13	6:05 pm	at Ferris State*	Robert L. Ewigleben Ice Arena • Big Rapids, Michigan	Talbot	L 2–5	1,071	2–9–1 (1–4–1)
December 27	7:05 pm	at 2008–09 Wisconsin Badgers men's ice hockey season*	Kohl Center • Madison, Wisconsin (Badger Showdown)	Talbot	L 0–5	12,887	2–10–1 (1–4–1)
December 28	4:05 pm	Harvard*	Kohl Center • Madison, Wisconsin (Badger Showdown)	MacNicol	W 4–1	13,422	3–10–1 (1–4–1)
January 9	7:00 pm	Robert Morris	Von Braun Center • Huntsville, Alabama	MacNicol	W 5–2	2,436	4–10–1 (2–4–1)
January 10	3:05 pm	Robert Morris	Von Braun Center • Huntsville, Alabama	Talbot	T 2–2 ^{OT}	2,172	4–10–2 (2–4–2)
January 16	6:35 pm	at Western Michigan*	Lawson Ice Arena • Kalamazoo, Michigan	Talbot	L 3–4	1,891	4–11–2 (2–4–2)
January 17	6:35 pm	at Western Michigan*	Lawson Ice Arena • Kalamazoo, Michigan	MacNicol	L 1–5	2,152	4–12–2 (2–4–2)
January 30	7:05 pm	Niagara	Von Braun Center • Huntsville, Alabama	Talbot	L 2–4	2,432	4–13–2 (2–5–2)
January 31	3:05 pm	Niagara	Von Braun Center • Huntsville, Alabama	MacNicol	T 5–5 ^{OT}	2,144	4–13–3 (2–5–3)
February 6	7:35 pm	at Bemidji State	John S. Glas Field House • Bemidji, Minnesota	Talbot	L 0–2	1,871	4–14–3 (2–6–3)
February 7	7:05 pm	at Bemidji State	John S. Glas Field House • Bemidji, Minnesota	MacNicol	L 2–4	1,893	4–15–3 (2–7–3)
February 13	7:05 pm	Niagara	Von Braun Center • Huntsville, Alabama	Talbot	L 2–4	2,638	4–16–3 (2–8–3)
February 14	3:05 pm	Niagara	Von Braun Center • Huntsville, Alabama	Talbot	W 3–1	1,699	5–16–3 (3–8–3)
February 20	5:05 pm	Robert Morris	Von Braun Center • Huntsville, Alabama	Talbot	L 1–3	2,837	5–17–3 (3–9–3)
February 21	3:05 pm	Robert Morris	Von Braun Center • Huntsville, Alabama	Talbot	L 3–6	2,675	5–18–3 (3–10–3)
March 6	6:05 pm	at Niagara	Dwyer Arena • Niagara, New York	Talbot	T 2–2 ^{OT}	1,136	5–18–4 (3–10–4)
March 7	6:05 pm	at Niagara	Dwyer Arena • Niagara, New York	Talbot	L 3–6	1,239	5–19–4 (3–11–4)
March 13	7:00 pm	at Bemidji State*	John S. Glas Field House • Bemidji, Minnesota (CHA Tournament Semifinal)	Talbot	L 1–4	1,710	5–20–4 (3–11–4)
March 14	2:00 pm	vs. Niagara*	John S. Glas Field House • Bemidji, Minnesota (CHA Tournament 3rd Place)	MacNicol	T 1–1 ^{OT}	850	5–20–5 (3–11–4)
*Non-conference game. All times are in Central Time.

=== Standings ===
2008–09 College Hockey America standings
	Conference							Overall					
	GP	W	L	T	PTS	GF	GA	GP	W	L	T	GF	GA
#9 Bemidji State†*	18	12	5	1	25	55	38	37	20	16	1	106	97
Niagara	18	9	5	4	22	53	44	36	16	14	6	98	92
Robert Morris	18	5	8	5	15	46	57	36	10	19	7	93	121
Alabama–Huntsville	18	3	11	4	10	43	58	30	5	20	5	63	99
Championship: Bemidji State † indicates conference regular season champion * indicates conference tournament champion Final rankings: USA Today/USA Hockey Magazine Top 15 Poll

=== Statistics ===
==== Skaters ====
Player	Pos	Yr	GP	G	A	Pts	PIM	PPG	SHG	GWG
Matt Sweazey	C	Sr	30	12	10	22	28	8	0	0
Cody Campbell	F	Fr	30	7	14	21	6	3	0	1
Andrew Coburn	F	So	30	9	10	19	16	5	0	2
Brandon Roshko	D	Jr	29	1	15	16	18	1	0	0
Tom Train	C	Jr	30	3	10	13	48	0	0	1
Joe Federoff	C	Sr	30	5	6	11	86	1	1	1
Kevin Morrison	LW	Jr	28	7	3	10	30	3	0	0
Scott Kalinchuk	D	Sr	30	1	9	10	30	1	0	0
Joey Koudys	F	So	24	4	5	9	18	0	0	0
Brennan Barker	D	Jr	26	2	6	8	46	0	0	0
Neil Ruffini	F	So	26	2	4	6	30	0	0	0
Tom Durnie	D	Fr	22	0	6	6	10	0	0	0
Cale Tanaka	LW	Jr	27	4	1	5	34	0	0	0
Josh Murray	RW	Sr	29	3	1	4	22	0	1	0
Chris Fairbanks	F	So	20	0	4	4	0	0	0	0
Matt Baxter	D	So	30	1	2	3	28	1	0	0
Mike Ward	D	So	19	0	3	3	6	0	0	0
Jamie Easton	F	Fr	26	0	3	3	8	0	0	0
Clark MacLean	F	Fr	13	1	1	2	6	0	0	0
Davide Nicoletti	D	Jr	2	1	0	1	2	0	0	0
Derek Conter	F	Sr	4	0	1	1	2	0	0	0
Kyle Goodchild	F	So	8	0	1	1	2	0	0	0
Vince Bruni	F	So	3	0	0	0	2	0	0	0
Blake MacNicol	G	Jr	12	0	0	0	0	0	0	0
Cameron Talbot	G	So	24	0	0	0	0	0	0	0
Ryan Burkholder	D	So	24	0	0	0	18	0	0	0
Team			30	63	115	178	496	23	2	5

==== Goalies ====
Player	Yr	GP	TOI	W	L	T	GA	GAA	SV	SV%	SO
Cameron Talbot	So	24	1320	2	16	3	65	2.95	635	0.907	1
Blake MacNicol	Jr	12	500	3	4	2	29	3.48	252	0.897	0
