= 2009 CHA men's ice hockey tournament =

2009 CHA Men's ice hockey tournament
- Dates: March 13–14, 2009
- Teams: 4
- Finals site: John S. Glas Field House; Bemidji, Minnesota
- Champions: Bemidji State (3rd title)
- Winning coach: Tom Serratore (3rd title)
- MVP: Matt Read (Bemidji State)
- CHA Men's Ice Hockey Tournaments

The 2009 CHA Men's Ice Hockey Tournament was the 10th tournament in conference history and was played between March 13 and March 14, 2009 at the John S. Glas Field House in Bemidji, Minnesota. By winning the tournament, Bemidji State received College Hockey America's automatic bid to the 2009 NCAA Division I Men's Ice Hockey Tournament.

== Format ==
The tournament featured two rounds of play. In the first round, the first and fourth seeds and second and third seeds each played for a berth in the championship game. The winners of the championship, played on March 14, 2009, received an automatic bid to the 2009 NCAA Division I Men's Ice Hockey Tournament.

=== Conference standings ===
Note: GP = Games played; W = Wins; L = Losses; T = Ties; PTS = Points; GF = Goals For; GA = Goals Against

2008–09 College Hockey America standings
	Conference							Overall					
	GP	W	L	T	PTS	GF	GA	GP	W	L	T	GF	GA
#9 Bemidji State†*	18	12	5	1	25	55	38	37	20	16	1	106	97
Niagara	18	9	5	4	22	53	44	36	16	14	6	98	92
Robert Morris	18	5	8	5	15	46	57	36	10	19	7	93	121
Alabama–Huntsville	18	3	11	4	10	43	58	30	5	20	5	63	99
Championship: Bemidji State † indicates conference regular season champion * indicates conference tournament champion Final rankings: USA Today/USA Hockey Magazine Top 15 Poll

== Bracket ==
Semifinals; March 13
1	Bemidji State	4
4	Alabama-Huntsville	1
3	Niagara	1
2	Robert Morris	2

Championship; March 14
1	Bemidji State	3*
3	Robert Morris	2
Third place
2	Niagara	1
4	Alabama-Huntsville	1

Note: * denotes overtime period(s)

=== Semifinals ===
==== (1) Bemidji State vs. (4) Alabama-Huntsville ====
March 13	Bemidji State	4 – 1	Alabama-Huntsville	John S. Glas Field House	Recap
Matt Read - 04:40		First period	No scoring
Matt Francis - pp - 01:06		Second period	05:51 - Joe Federoff
Brandon Marino - 02:22; Matt Read - en - 19:16		Third period	No scoring
Matt Dalton ( 25 saves / 26 shots )		Goalie stats	Cameron Talbot ( 29 saves / 32 shots )

==== (2) Niagara vs. (3) Robert Morris ====
March 13	Niagara	1 – 2	Robert Morris	John S. Glas Field House	Recap
No Scoring		First period	11:53 - pp - Denny Urban
No scoring		Second period	14:09 - Trevor Lewis
Derek Foam - 05:49		Third period	No scoring
Juliano Pagliero ( 27 saves / 29 shots )		Goalie stats	Brooks Ostergard ( 27 saves / 28 shots )

=== Third place ===
==== (2) Niagara vs. (4) Alabama-Huntsville ====
March 14	Niagara	1 – 1	OT	Alabama-Huntsville	John S. Glas Field House	Recap
Dan Sullivan - 09:20		First period		03:07 - Kevin Morrison
No scoring		Second period		No scoring
No scoring		Third period		No scoring
No Scoring		First overtime period		No scoring
Adam Avramenko ( 46 saves / 47 shots )		Goalie stats		Blake MacNicol ( 38 saves / 39 shots )

=== Championship ===
==== (1) Bemidji State vs. (3) Robert Morris ====
March 14	Bemidji State	3 – 2	OT	Robert Morris	John S. Glas Field House	Recap
Tyler Scofield - pp - 19:30		First period		03:53 - Ron Cramer
Matt Read - 14:08		Second period		18:47 - pp - Chris Margott
No scoring		Third period		No scoring
Matt Read - 08:05		First overtime period		No scoring
Matt Dalton ( 29 saves / 31 shots )		Goalie stats		Brooks Ostergard ( 37 saves / 40 shots )

== Tournament awards ==
=== All-Tournament Team ===
- Goaltender: Matt Dalton (Bemidji State)
- Defensemen: Brad Hunt (Bemidji State), Dan Sullivan (Niagara)
- Forwards: Matt Francis (Bemidji State), Chris Margott (Robert Morris), Matt Read (Bemidji State)

=== MVP ===
- Matt Read (Bemidji State)
