= Erika Lawler =

American ice hockey player (born 1987)

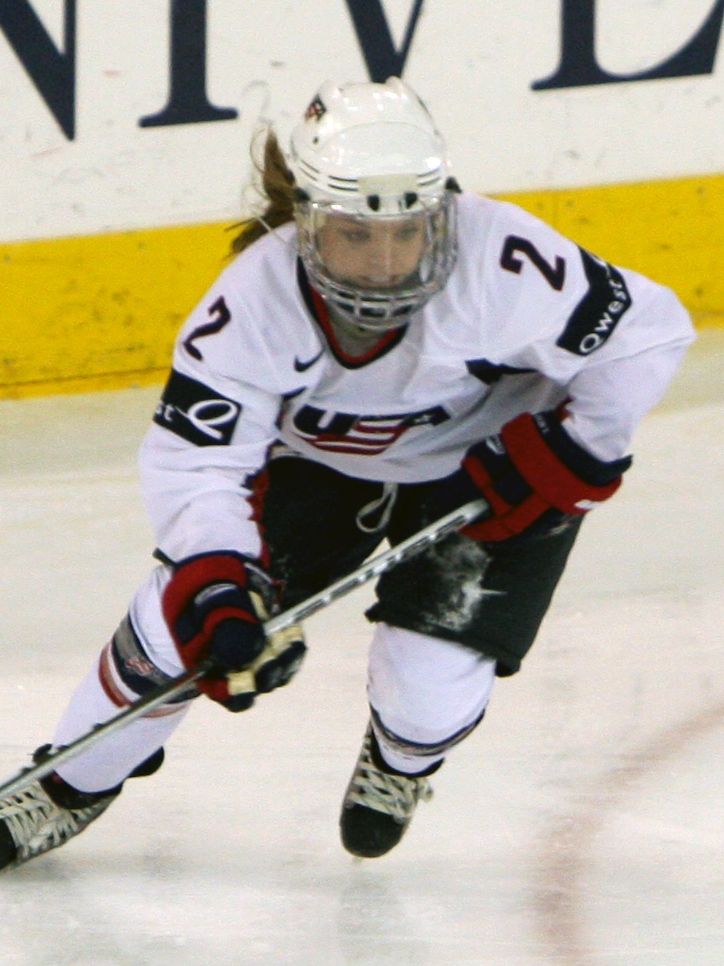
- Born: February 5, 1987 (age 39) Fitchburg, Massachusetts, U.S.
- Height: 4 ft 11 in (150 cm)
- Weight: 134 lb (61 kg; 9 st 8 lb)
- Position: Forward
- Shot: Right
- Played for: Boston Blades
- National team: United States
- Playing career: 2005–2012
Medal record
Representing United States
Women's ice hockey
Olympic Games
Silver medal – second place	2010 Vancouver	Tournament
IIHF World Women's Championships
Gold medal – first place	2008 China	Tournament
Gold medal – first place	2009 Finland	Tournament
Silver medal – second place	2007 Canada	Tournament
Silver medal – second place	2012 United States	Tournament
Women's 4 Nations Cup
Silver medal – second place	2010 Canada	Tournament

Erika Lyn Lawler (born February 5, 1987) is a retired Women's Ice Hockey player. She was notably a member of the 2009–10 United States national women's ice hockey team which participated in the 2010 Olympic Winter Games and a member of the CWHL's Boston Blades (2011-2013) and the NWHL's Metropolitan Riveters (2017-2019). Lawler also played prep hockey at Cushing Academy where she won the Bette Davis Award as the top athlete in her class three times. She then played collegiately for the Wisconsin Badgers of the Western Collegiate Hockey Association and won three NCAA titles (2006, 2007 and 2009).

== Playing career ==
=== Wisconsin Badgers ===
Over the course of her career as a Wisconsin Badger, Erika Lawler received many accolades and awards. With her team, she won three NCAA titles in four seasons (2006, 2007, and 2009). She played in 163 games for the Wisconsin Badgers, which was the most in school history. She also ranks 2nd for most career assists with 119, 7th for all-time Career goals with 55, and 3rd all time in points with 174.

==== 2005-2006 ====
In her first year as a Badger, Erika Lawler helped her team win the NCAA National Tournament. She played all 41 games that season, and finished sixth in scoring on the team with 13 goals, 19 assists, and 32 points.

==== 2006-2007 ====
In her sophomore year, Lawler helped her team win their second consecutive NCAA title. She again played in all 41 games that season, and led the team with 28 assists.

==== 2007-2008 ====
In her junior year, Lawler led her team in assists with 28 for the second consecutive year. Though Lawler and the Badgers did not win the NCAA title in 2008, they still made it to the Championship game, where they lost 4–0 to Minnesota-Duluth.

==== 2008-2009 ====
In her senior year, Erika Lawler was named captain of the Wisconsin Badgers. She led the team to the NCAA Championship, where she won her third and final title. She led the entire NCAA in assists scoring with 44 assists. She was a Top-10 finalist for the Patty Kazmaier Memorial Award.

Season	Games Played	Goals	Assists	Points	PPG
2005–06	41	13	19	32	1
2006–07	41	10	28	38	1
2007–08	41	12	28	40	3
2008–09	40	20	44	64	7

=== USA Hockey ===
Three-time member of the United States Women's National Team for the International Ice Hockey Federation World Women's Championship (gold-2008-09, silver- 2007) … Four-time member of the United States Women's Select Team for the Four Nations Cup (1st-2008, 2nd-2006-07, 2009) … Member of the United States Women's National Team in 2009– 10 (Qwest Tour) … Three-time member of the United States Women's Under-22 Select Team for the Under-22 Series with Canada (2006–08). Cocaptained the team in 2008 … Four-time USA Hockey Women's National Festival participant (2006–09) … Four-time USA Hockey Player Development Camp attendee (2002–05).

==== 2010 Olympic team ====
Received Silver Medal in the XXI 2010 Winter Olympics in Vancouver. Erika and the USA Women's Hockey Team lost 2–0 against Canada on February 25, 2010.

== Awards and honors ==
USA Hockey

Three-time member of the U.S. Women's National Team for the International Ice Hockey Federation World Women's Championship (gold-2008-09, silver-2007) ... Three-time member of the U.S. Women's Select Team for the Four Nations Cup (1st-2008, 2nd-2006-07) ... Three-time member of the U.S. Women's Under-22 Select Team for the Under-22 Series with Canada (2006–08). Co-captained the team in 2008 ... Four-time USA Hockey Women's National Festival participant (2006–09) ... Four-time USA Hockey Player Development Camp attendee (2002–05).

College
Played four seasons at the University of Wisconsin of the Western Collegiate Hockey Association, where she was part of three national championship teams ... Her 174 career points (55–119) rank third in school history. As a Senior (2008–09): Captained the Badgers to the 2009 NCAA National Championship ... Led the NCAA with 44 assists ... Earned All-WCHA Second Team honors ... Top-10 finalist for the Patty Kazmaier Memorial Award. As a Junior (2007–08): Helped the Badgers to the NCAA title game ... Led the team with 28 assists and ranked third with 40 points ... All-WCHA Second Team honoree. As a Sophomore (2006–07): Helped lead the team to the NCAA National Championship for the second consecutive year ... All-WCHA Third Team selection. As a Freshman (2005–06): Helped the Badgers win the NCAA title.

- 2008 Badger Award
- Led the NCAA with 44 assists in 2009

== Personal life ==
Lawler is an ally and champion for LGBTQ+ rights. In 2023, she signed an open letter opposing transgender sports bans in America, joining star athletes like Megan Rapinoe, Sue Bird, and longtime teammate Meghan Duggan.
