= Meghan Duggan =

American ice hockey player (born 1987)

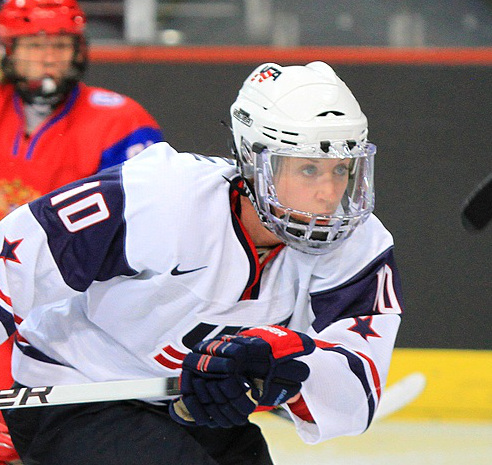
- Meghan Duggan at the IIHF World Women Championship 2011
- Born: September 3, 1987 (age 39) Danvers, Massachusetts, U.S.
- Height: 5 ft 10 in (178 cm)
- Weight: 170 lb (77 kg; 12 st 2 lb)
- Position: Forward
- Shot: Right
- Played for: University of Wisconsin; Boston Blades; Buffalo Beauts; Boston Pride
- National team: United States
- Playing career: 2006–2020
Medal record
Olympic Games
Gold medal – first place	2018 Pyeongchang	Team
Silver medal – second place	2010 Vancouver	Team
Silver medal – second place	2014 Sochi	Team
World Championships
Silver medal – second place	2007 Canada	Team
Gold medal – first place	2008 China	Team
Gold medal – first place	2009 Finland	Team
Gold medal – first place	2011 Switzerland	Team
Gold medal – first place	2013 Canada	Team
Gold medal – first place	2015 Sweden	Team
Gold medal – first place	2016 Canada	Team
Gold medal – first place	2017 United States	Team

Meghan Duggan (born September 3, 1987) is an American former ice hockey forward and, since May 2026, the first general manager of the Hamilton Havoc. Formerly, she worked as director of player development for the New Jersey Devils of the National Hockey League.

She played for the United States at the 2010 Winter Olympics and 2014 Winter Olympics, winning two silver medals; she was the captain of the U.S. team at the 2018 Winter Olympics, where she won a gold medal. She also represented the United States at eight Women's World Championships, capturing seven gold medals and one silver medal. Duggan played collegiate hockey with the Wisconsin Badgers between 2006 and 2011. After her senior season (2010–11), Duggan was named the winner of the Patty Kazmaier Award, presented annually to the top women's ice hockey player in the National Collegiate Athletic Association (NCAA). After her career at Wisconsin, Duggan was the team's all-time leading scorer. She was drafted 8th overall by the Boston Blades in the 2011 CWHL Draft.

Duggan announced her retirement from professional hockey on October 13, 2020 at age 33.

== Early life ==
Duggan was born on September 3, 1987, in Danvers, Massachusetts. Growing up, she played ice hockey, soccer, softball, and lacrosse, but hockey was always her "number one sport". She began skating in the Danvers Youth Hockey program, and admired United States women's national ice hockey team player Gretchen Ulion. Her older brother Brian also played hockey, and Duggan often played in boys' leagues, which was the "only option" at the time.

Duggan attended high school at Cushing Academy in Ashburnham, Massachusetts, where she played on the school's girls' hockey team in the New England Preparatory School Athletic Council (NEPSAC). Her roommate was Erika Lawler, who would later become her college and Olympic teammate. While attending Cushing, Duggan met Olympian Julie Chu and other members of the USA women's national team at an informal skate in Boston. Duggan was also a three-time honoree of the Bette Davis award, given by Cushing to the best female athlete in her class.

== Playing career ==
=== Wisconsin Badgers ===
On December 6, 2005, the University of Wisconsin announced that Duggan was one of four student-athletes who signed a National Letter of Intent, committing to joining the Wisconsin Badgers women's ice hockey program beginning in the 2006–07 season. The other three were Alannah McCready, Emily Kranz, and Kyla Sanders.

Her freshman season with the Badgers was in 2006–07. She ranked second on the team with 52 points, as she led freshmen in scoring, while scoring 26 goals. During the season, she scored three game-winning goals and recorded 16 multi-point games. In the NCAA, her 52 points were good enough for third in the nation in rookie scoring. Duggan earned three consecutive WCHA Rookie of the Week honors, becoming the first Badger to ever win a conference award in three straight weeks. In addition, she accumulated five WCHA weekly honors overall, the most by a Badgers player in a single season.

On January 22, 2011, Duggan assisted on the Badgers' second goal of the game, against the defending national champions, the Minnesota-Duluth Bulldogs, and extended her point streak to 22 games, the longest individual point streak in Wisconsin women's hockey history.

Duggan finished the season as the WCHA scoring champion by accumulating 61 points (27 goals, 34 assists) in 28 games. On March 12, 2011, she scored the game-winning goal (it was her sixth game-winning goal of the season) in the NCAA regional playoff, as Wisconsin defeated Minnesota-Duluth by a 2–1 mark.

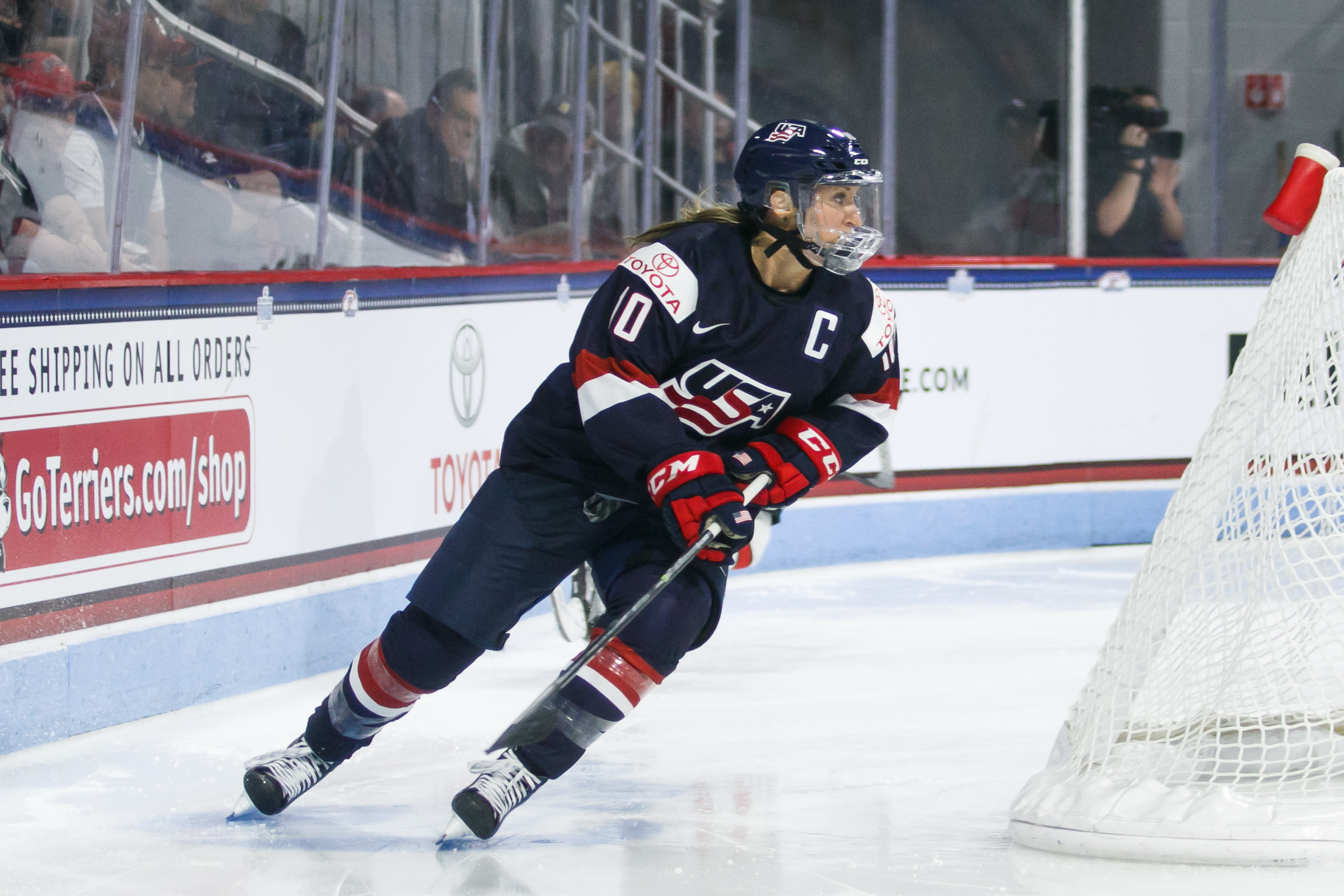
Meghan Duggan playing for Team USA in 2017

=== Professional career ===
Duggan played six seasons of professional hockey, including four with the Boston Blades of the Canadian Women's Hockey League (2011–15), who won the Clarkson Cup in 2013 and 2015. In 2015 she moved to the newly formed National Women's Hockey League played one season with the Buffalo Beauts. In December 2015, it was announced that Duggan had signed a personal services agreement with Dunkin' Donuts as part of the company's sponsorship deal of the NWHL. She played her final pro season with the Boston Pride for the 2016–17 season.

=== International play ===
Duggan's first International Ice Hockey Federation (IIHF) tournament with the American senior women's team was the 2007 IIHF Women's World Championship held in Manitoba, Canada. Duggan recorded a single assist for the Americans at the tournament, as they took home the silver medal. At the 2009 tournament, the American team captured its second straight gold medal by defeating Canada in the final. Duggan scored two goals in the tournament, finishing tenth on the American team in scoring.

Duggan was chosen to the 2010 US Olympic team. At the Olympics, Duggan played mainly with Gigi Marvin and Natalie Darwitz. She finished the tournament with four goals, as the American team captured the silver medal. At the 2011 IIHF Women's World Championship, Meghan Duggan was among the tournament's top five scorers. Duggan was fifth with seven points (four goals, three assists).

Duggan captained the Team USA women's hockey team in the 2014 Olympics, once again losing to Canada. On March 15, 2017, players for the U.S. women's ice hockey team, led by Duggan, announced that they would boycott the 2017 World Championship over inequitable support and conditions for women's ice hockey unless concessions were made by USA Hockey. On March 28 USA Hockey agreed to the players demands and Duggan led Team USA to a gold medal win at the tournament. They would finally win Olympic gold at the 2018 Olympics, defeating Canada in a shootout, with Duggan again serving as captain.

Duggan announced her retirement from professional hockey on October 13, 2020 at age 33.

== Administrative career ==
On May 19, 2021, the New Jersey Devils of the National Hockey League (NHL) announced that Duggan had been appointed manager of player development, a new role within the franchise's hockey operations department. On May 31, 2022, she was promoted to director of player development. Ahead of the 2024–25 season, the Professional Women's Hockey League (PWHL) named Duggan a special consultant to hockey operations.

On May 22, 2026, Duggan was announced as the inaugural general manager for the Hamilton Havoc of the Professional Women's Hockey League.

== Awards and honors ==
- 2024 Inducted into the Little League Hall of Excellence
- 2018 Olympic gold medalist
- 2017 IIHF Women's World Championship – 2017 IIHF Women's World Championship Won gold medal
- 2016 IIHF Women's World Championship – 2016 IIHF Women's World Championship Won gold medal
- 2015 IIHF Women's World Championship – 2015 IIHF Women's World Championship Won gold medal
- Captain of the 2015–2017 IIHF Women's World Championship Team 2015 IIHF Women's World Championship
- 2015 Boston Blades, member of Clarkson Cup Champions
- 2014 Canadian Women's Hockey League All Star Game participant at Air Canada Centre
- 2014 Olympic silver medalist
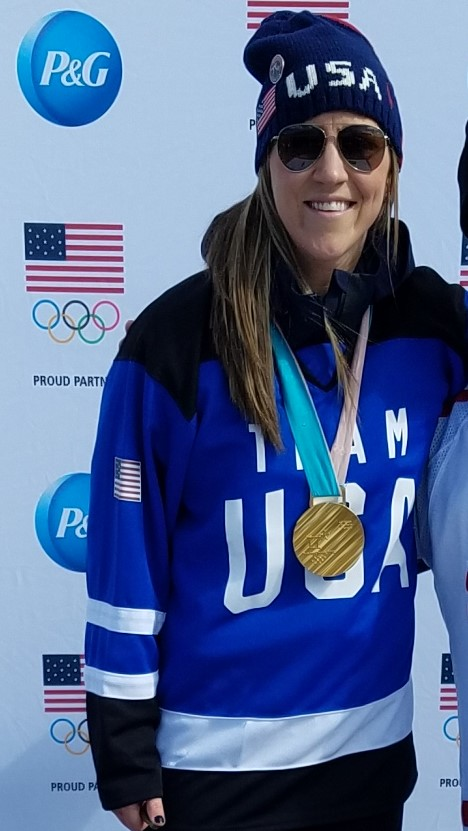
- Meghan Duggan with 2018 gold medal at an appearance in Quincy, MA
  Named captain of 2014 United States Olympic team
- 2013 IIHF Women's World Championship – 2013 IIHF Women's World Championship Won gold medal
- 2012 IIHF Women's World Championship – 2012 IIHF Women's World Championship Won silver medal
- 2011 IIHF Women's World Championship – 2011 IIHF Women's World Championship Won gold medal
- 2011 Graduate, University of Wisconsin (BIOLOGY)
- 2011 WCHA Player of the Year
- 2011 WCHA scoring champion
- 2011 All-WCHA First Team
- Finalist, 2011 Sportswoman of the Year, presented by the Women's Sports Foundation
- 2011 Big Ten Outstanding Sportsmanship Award
- 2011 First Team All-America selection
- 2011 Patty Kazmaier Memorial Award winner
- 2011 Bob Allen Women's Player of the Year Award, awarded by USA Hockey
- 2010 Olympic silver medalist
- 2009 IIHF Women's World Championship – 2009 IIHF Women's World Championship Won gold medal
- 2008 IIHF Women's World Championship – 2008 IIHF Women's World Championship Won gold medal
- 2007 IIHF Women's World Championship – 2007 IIHF Women's World Championship Won silver medal
- 2007 Graduate, Cushing Academy (Ashburnham, MA)
- Two-time member of the U.S. Women's Select Team for the Four Nations Cup (1st-2008, 2nd-2007)
- Two-time member of the U.S. Women's Under-22 Select Team for the Under-22 Series with Canada (2007–08). Co-captained the team in 2008
- Three-time USA Hockey Women's National Festival participant (2007–09)
- Three-time USA Hockey Player Development Camp attendee (2003–05).
- USCHO.com Offensive Player of the Week (Oct. 23, 2006)
- WCHA Offensive Player of the Week, (Week of January 26, 2011)
- WCHA Offensive Player of the Week (Week of February 16, 2011)

== Coaching ==
Duggan began coaching for Clarkson University's women's ice hockey team in September 2014 while she played for the American national hockey team and the Boston Blades.

== Personal life ==
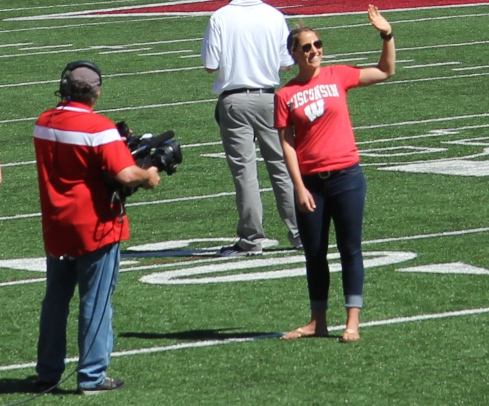
Duggan (right) waves to crowd after being introduced at a Wisconsin Badgers football game

On April 19, 2010, Duggan threw the first pitch at a Boston Red Sox game before a sellout Patriots' Day crowd of 37,609 with former teammates. On April 25, 2014, Duggan was honored to throw the first pitch at a Boston Red Sox game for a second time with her Team USA 2014 US Olympic teammates.

On September 22, 2018, she married Canadian women's hockey player Gillian Apps, whom she had played against at the 2010 and 2014 Olympics. They had their first child together, a boy named George, in February 2020. Their second child, a daughter named Olivia, was born in October 2021. Their third child, daughter Sophie, was born on December 31, 2023.

In 2024, Meghan gave the keynote address at the Bachelor's, Master's and Juris Doctor degree Candidate Ceremony for the University of Wisconsin-Madison at Camp Randall Stadium on Saturday, May 11, 2024.

== Career statistics ==
=== Regular season and playoffs ===
			Regular season					Playoffs
Season	Team	League	GP	G	A	Pts	PIM	GP	G	A	Pts	PIM
2006–07	University of Wisconsin	WCHA	39	26	26	52	34	—	—	—	—	—
2007–08	University of Wisconsin	WCHA	38	20	23	43	38	—	—	—	—	—
2008–09	University of Wisconsin	WCHA	41	23	33	56	44	—	—	—	—	—
2010–11	University of Wisconsin	WCHA	41	39	48	87	30	—	—	—	—	—
2011–12	Boston Blades	CWHL	4	0	0	0	0	—	—	—	—	—
2012–13	Boston Blades	CWHL	14	5	8	13	24	4	0	2	2	4
2013–14	Boston Blades	CWHL	1	0	0	0	0	—	—	—	—	—
2014–15	Boston Blades	CWHL	7	1	5	6	12	—	—	—	—	—
2015–16	Buffalo Beauts	NWHL	13	6	10	16	14	2	0	1	1	4
2016–17	Boston Pride	NWHL	17	13	7	20	24	2	0	1	1	0
CWHL totals			26	6	13	19	36	4	0	2	2	4
NWHL totals			30	19	17	36	38	4	0	2	2	4

=== International ===
Year	Team	Event	Result	GP	G	A	Pts	PIM
2007	United States	WWC	2nd place, silver medalist(s)	5	0	1	1	4
2008	United States	WWC	1st place, gold medalist(s)	5	4	1	5	2
2009	United States	WWC	1st place, gold medalist(s)	5	2	0	2	2
2010	United States	OG	2nd place, silver medalist(s)	5	4	0	4	2
2011	United States	WWC	1st place, gold medalist(s)	5	4	3	7	2
2013	United States	WWC	1st place, gold medalist(s)	5	0	1	1	4
2014	United States	OG	2nd place, silver medalist(s)	5	1	1	2	2
2015	United States	WWC	1st place, gold medalist(s)	4	1	2	3	0
2016	United States	WWC	1st place, gold medalist(s)	5	1	0	1	2
2017	United States	WWC	1st place, gold medalist(s)	5	0	0	0	0
2018	United States	OG	1st place, gold medalist(s)	5	0	2	2	0
World Championship totals				39	12	8	20	16
Olympic totals				15	5	3	8	4

Awards and achievements
Preceded by Natalie Darwitz	Captain, United States Olympic Hockey Team; 2014, 2018	Succeeded by Kendall Coyne Schofield
Preceded by Vicki Bendus	Patty Kazmaier Award; 2010–11	Succeeded by Brianna Decker
