= 2009 WCHA men's ice hockey tournament =

2009 WCHA Men's ice hockey tournament
- 2009 WCHA Final Five logo
- Dates: March 13–21, 2009
- Teams: 10
- Finals site: Xcel Energy Center; St. Paul, Minnesota
- Champions: Minnesota-Duluth (3rd title)
- Winning coach: Scott Sandelin (1st title)
- MVP: Alex Stalock (Minnesota-Duluth)
- WCHA Men's Ice Hockey Tournaments

The 2009 WCHA Men's Ice Hockey Tournament was the 50th conference playoff in league history and 55th season where a WCHA champion was crowned. The 2009 tournament was played between March 13 and March 21, 2009, at five conference arenas and the Xcel Energy Center in St. Paul, Minnesota. By winning the tournament, Minnesota–Duluth was awarded the Broadmoor Trophy and received the Western Collegiate Hockey Association's automatic bid to the 2009 NCAA Men's Division I Ice Hockey Tournament.

== Format ==
The first round of the postseason tournament featured a best-of-three games format. All ten conference teams participated in the tournament. Teams were seeded No. 1 through No. 10 according to their final conference standing, with a tiebreaker system used to seed teams with an identical number of points accumulated. The top five seeded teams each earned home ice and host one of the lower seeded teams.

The winners of the first round series advanced to the Xcel Energy Center for the WCHA Final Five, the collective name for the quarterfinal, semifinal, and championship rounds. The Final Five used a single-elimination format. Teams were re-seeded No. 1 through No. 5 according to the final regular season conference standings, with the top three teams automatically advancing to the semifinals.

=== Conference standings ===
Note: GP = Games played; W = Wins; L = Losses; T = Ties; PTS = Points; GF = Goals For; GA = Goals Against

2008–09 Western Collegiate Hockey Association standings
	Conference							Overall					
	GP	W	L	T	PTS	GF	GA	GP	W	L	T	GF	GA
#13 North Dakota†	28	17	7	4	38	96	74	43	24	15	4	146	118
#7 Denver	28	16	8	4	36	96	68	40	23	12	5	132	96
Wisconsin	28	14	11	3	31	92	78	40	20	16	4	131	106
Colorado College	28	12	9	7	31	79	82	38	16	12	10	103	103
Minnesota	28	12	11	5	29	87	83	37	17	13	7	119	105
St. Cloud State	28	13	13	2	28	83	81	38	18	17	3	122	107
#8 Minnesota–Duluth*	28	10	11	7	27	78	72	43	22	13	8	128	98
Minnesota State	28	11	13	4	26	88	90	38	15	17	6	117	122
Alaska–Anchorage	28	9	14	5	23	69	93	36	14	17	5	95	111
Michigan Tech	28	2	19	7	11	47	94	38	6	25	7	62	122
Championship: Minnesota–Duluth † indicates conference regular season champion * indicates conference tournament champion Final rankings: USA Today/USA Hockey Magazine Top 15 Poll

==== Tiebreakers ====
- Wisconsin and Colorado College each finished the regular season with 31 points. Wisconsin won the tiebreaker, having the better head-to-head record of the two teams.

== Bracket ==
Teams are reseeded after the first round

First round March 13–14
1	North Dakota	5	4	—
10	Michigan Tech	1	3	—
2	Denver	3	4	—
9	Alaska-Anchorage	2	3	—
3	Wisconsin	7	4	—
8	Minnesota State	1	2	—
4	Colorado College	1	1	—
7	Minnesota-Duluth	4	3	—
5	Minnesota	4	3	—
6	St. Cloud State	2	0	—

Quarterfinal; March 19
4	Minnesota	1
5	Minnesota-Duluth	2

Semifinals; March 20
1	North Dakota	0
5	Minnesota-Duluth	3
2	Denver	3
3	Wisconsin	0

Championship; March 21
2	Denver	0
5	Minnesota-Duluth	4

=== First round ===
==== (1) North Dakota vs. (10) Michigan Tech ====
March 13	North Dakota	5 – 1	Michigan Tech	Ralph Engelstad Arena	Recap
Chris VandeVelde - 17:04		First period	No scoring
Ryan Duncan - pp - 03:00; Evan Trupp - 06:08		Second period	No scoring
Darcy Zajac - sh - 10:13; Mario Lamoureux - 11:13		Third period	06:13 - pp - Alex MacLeod
Brad Eidsness ( 20 saves / 21 shots )		Goalie stats	Rob Nolan ( 26 saves / 31 shots ) Josh Robinson ( 5 saves / 0 shots )

March 14	North Dakota	4 – 3	Michigan Tech	Ralph Engelstad Arena	Recap
No Scoring		First period	18:54 - pp - Alex MacLeod
Ryan Duncan - pp - 08:30; Ryan Duncan - pp - 10:31; Ryan Duncan - 11:46		Second period	17:31 - pp - Jordan Baker
Matt Frattin - 05:29		Third period	16:35 - Drew Dobson
Brad Eidsness ( 24 saves / 27 shots )		Goalie stats	Josh Robinson ( 10 saves / 13 shots ) Rob Nolan ( 5 saves / 6 shots )

North Dakota won series 2–0

==== (2) Denver vs. (9) Alaska-Anchorage ====
March 13	Denver	3 – 2	Alaska-Anchorage	Magness Arena	Recap
Tyler Ruegsegger - pp - 15:35; Tyler Ruegsegger - 17:33		First period	03:52 - Luka Vidmar; 05:45 - Kevin Clark
No scoring		Second period	No scoring
Jesse Martin - 13:03		Third period	No scoring
Marc Cheverie ( 19 saves / 21 shots )		Goalie stats	Jon Olthuis ( 28 saves / 31 shots )

March 14	Denver	4 – 3	Alaska-Anchorage	Magness Arena	Recap
Rhett Rakhshani - 11:54; Jesse Martin - 18:39		First period	06:54 - Kevin Clark; 14:37 - Tommy Grant
Patrick Mullen - pp - 14:36		Second period	16:33 - pp - Mat Robinson
Luke Salazar - 19:12		Third period	No scoring
Marc Cheverie ( 31 saves / 34 shots )		Goalie stats	Bryce Christianson ( 21 saves / 25 shots )

Denver won series 2–0

==== (3) Wisconsin vs. (8) Minnesota State ====
March 13	Wisconsin	7 – 1	Minnesota State	Kohl Center	Recap
No Scoring		First period	No scoring
Derek Stepan - pp - 01:38; Ben Grotting - 10:50		Second period	No scoring
Blake Geoffrion - 04:46; Jake Gardiner - 08:56; Blake Geoffrion - 17:36; John Mitchell - 18:48; Cody Goloubef - pp - 19:20		Third period	18:10 - Jason Wiley
Shane Connelly ( 26 saves / 27 shots )		Goalie stats	Mike Zacharias ( 47 saves / 50 shots ) Dan Tormey ( 12 saves / 16 shots )

March 14	Wisconsin	4 – 2	Minnesota State	Kohl Center	Recap
Ryan McDonagh - 06:48		First period	11:21 - Andrew Sackrison
Andy Bohmbach - 08:18; Blake Geoffrion - 13:44		Second period	No scoring
Tom Gorowsky - 17:19		Third period	17:38 - Adam Mueller
Shane Connelly ( 28 saves / 30 shots )		Goalie stats	Mike Zacharias ( 41 saves / 45 shots )

Wisconsin won series 2–0

==== (4) Colorado College vs. (7) Minnesota-Duluth ====
March 13	Colorado College	1 – 4	Minnesota-Duluth	World Arena	Recap
No Scoring		First period	10:25 - pp - Josh Meyers; 18:02 - pp - MacGregor Sharp
Eric Walsky - pp - 15:53		Second period	07:21 - Jordan Fulton
No scoring		Third period	03:52 - Justin Fontaine
Richard Bachman ( 35 saves / 39 shots )		Goalie stats	Alex Stalock ( 36 saves / 37 shots )

March 14	Colorado College	1 – 3	Minnesota-Duluth	World Arena	Recap
Scott McCulloch - pp - 15:32		First period	04:47 - pp - Jack Connolly; 11:04 - pp - Nick Kemp
No scoring		Second period	11:37 - Michael Gergen
No scoring		Third period	No scoring
Richard Bachman ( 23 saves / 26 shots )		Goalie stats	Alex Stalock ( 29 saves / 30 shots )

Minnesota-Duluth won series 2–0

==== (5) Minnesota vs. (6) St. Cloud State ====
March 13	Minnesota	4 – 2	St. Cloud State	Mariucci Arena	Recap
Nico Sacchetti - pp - 12:24		First period	No scoring
Mike Hoeffel - pp - 14:57		Second period	No scoring
Jay Barriball - 13:41; Ryan Stoa - en - 19:53		Third period	10:03 - Garrett Roe; 15:20 - pp - Garrett Roe
Alex Kangas ( 29 saves / 31 shots )		Goalie stats	Jase Weslosky ( 33 saves / 36 shots )

March 14	Minnesota	3 – 0	St. Cloud State	Mariucci Arena	Recap
Ryan Stoa - 04:09		First period	No scoring
Jay Barriball - pp - 07:44		Second period	No scoring
Ryan Stoa - en sh - 19:29		Third period	No scoring
Alex Kangas ( 34 saves / 34 shots )		Goalie stats	Jase Weslosky ( 18 saves / 20 shots )

Minnesota won series 2–0

=== Quarterfinal ===
==== (4) Minnesota vs. (5) Minnesota-Duluth ====
March 19	Minnesota	1 – 2	Minnesota-Duluth	Xcel Energy Center	Recap
No Scoring		First period	03:46 - MacGregor Sharp
No scoring		Second period	14:34 - Matt Greer
Cade Fairchild - 06:08		Third period	No scoring
Alex Kangas ( 9 saves / 10 shots ) Kent Patterson ( 19 saves / 20 shots )		Goalie stats	Alex Stalock ( 39 saves / 40 shots )

=== Semifinals ===
==== (1) North Dakota vs. (5) Minnesota-Duluth ====
March 20	North Dakota	0 – 3	Minnesota-Duluth	Xcel Energy Center	Recap
No Scoring		First period	05:10 - sh - MacGregor Sharp; 07:41 - Mike Montgomery
No scoring		Second period	No scoring
No scoring		Third period	18:07 - en - Mike Connolly
Brad Eidsness ( 21 saves / 23 shots )		Goalie stats	Alex Stalock ( 31 saves / 31 shots )

==== (2) Denver vs. (3) Wisconsin ====
March 20	Denver	3 – 0	Wisconsin	Xcel Energy Center	Recap
Brian Gifford - 15:20		First period	No scoring
Kyle Ostrow - 13:40		Second period	No scoring
Patrick Wiercioch - pp - 06:01		Third period	No scoring
Marc Cheverie ( 42 saves / 42 shots )		Goalie stats	Shane Connelly ( 26 saves / 29 shots )

=== Third place ===
==== (1) North Dakota vs. (3) Wisconsin ====
March 21	North Dakota	1 – 4	Wisconsin	Xcel Energy Center	Recap
Ryan Duncan - 07:45		First period	No scoring
No scoring		Second period	03:37 - Andy Bohmbach; 08:28 - Jordy Murray; 19:15 - pp - Brendan Smith
No scoring		Third period	17:04 - pp - Jordy Murray
Brad Eidsness ( 34 saves / 38 shots )		Goalie stats	Shane Connelly ( 35 saves / 36 shots )

=== Championship ===
==== (2) Denver vs. (5) Minnesota-Duluth ====
March 21	Denver	0 – 4	Minnesota-Duluth	Xcel Energy Center	Recap
No Scoring		First period	10:45 - pp - MacGregor Sharp
No scoring		Second period	09:13 - MacGregor Sharp; 11:57 - pp - Jack Connolly
No scoring		Third period	17:28 - en - MacGregor Sharp
Marc Cheverie ( 26 saves / 29 shots )		Goalie stats	Alex Stalock ( 20 saves / 20 shots )

== Tournament awards ==
=== All-Tournament Team ===
- F Mike Connolly (Minnesota-Duluth)
- F Jordy Murray (Wisconsin)
- F MacGregor Sharp (Minnesota-Duluth)
- D Josh Meyers (Minnesota-Duluth)
- D Patrick Wiercioch (Denver)
- G Alex Stalock* (Minnesota-Duluth)

* Most Valuable Player(s)
