= Josh Meyers (ice hockey) =

American ice hockey player (born 1985)

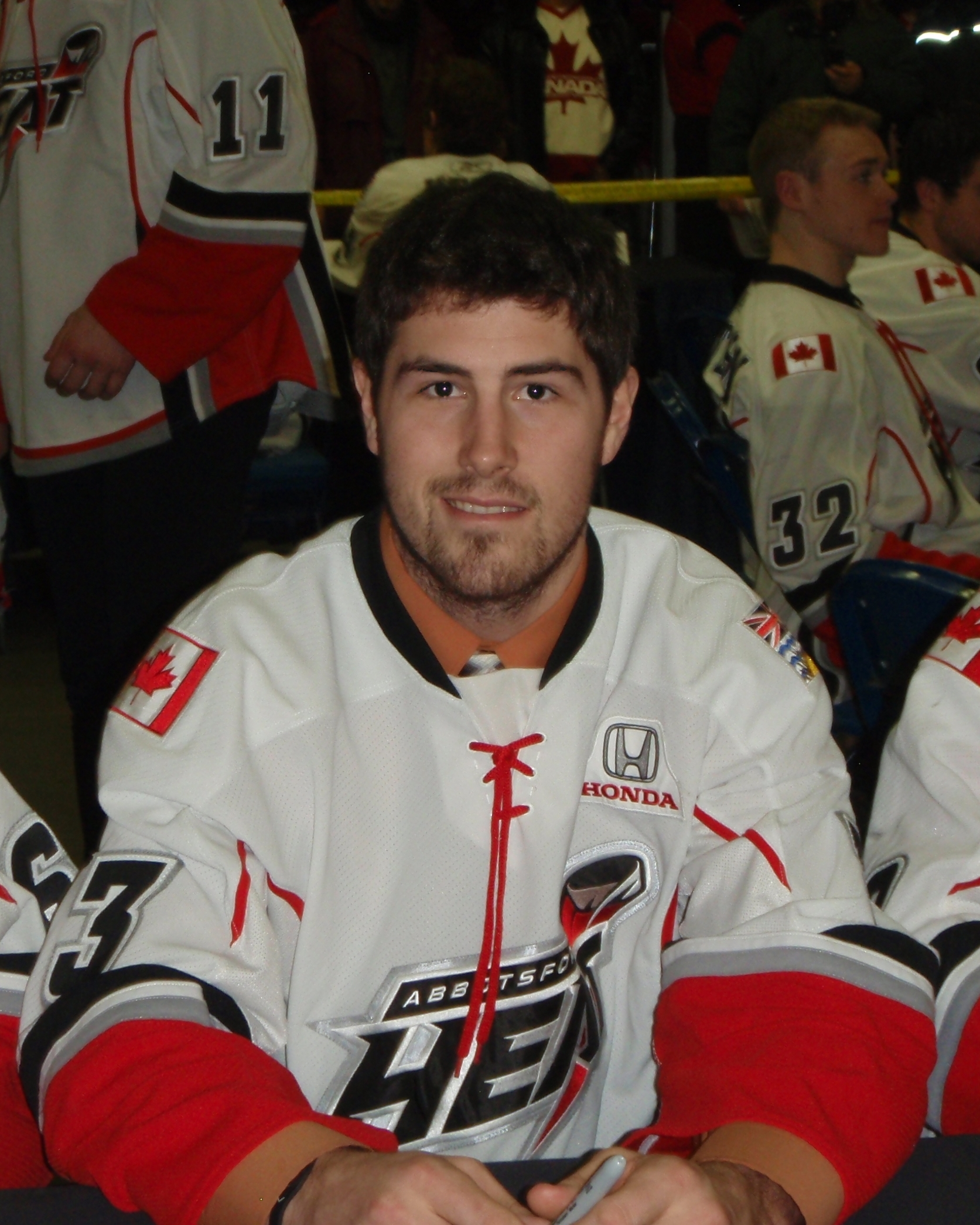
- Born: December 7, 1985 (age 40) Alexandria, Minnesota, U.S.
- Height: 6 ft 3 in (191 cm)
- Weight: 185 lb (84 kg; 13 st 3 lb)
- Position: Defence
- Shot: Right
- Played for: Abbotsford Heat; HC Bolzano; Krefeld Pinguine
- NHL draft: 206th overall, 2005; Los Angeles Kings
- Playing career: 2009–2015

Josh Meyers (born December 7, 1985) is an American former professional ice hockey player. He last played for the Krefeld Pinguine in the Deutsche Eishockey Liga (DEL). He was selected by the Los Angeles Kings in the 7th round (206th overall) of the 2005 NHL entry draft.

== Playing career ==
Meyers played four seasons (2005–09) of college ice hockey at the University of Minnesota Duluth with the Minnesota–Duluth Bulldogs in the WCHA at the NCAA Division I level.

On May 30, 2010, he was signed as a free agent by the Calgary Flames.

After three seasons in Germany with Krefeld Pinguine of the DEL, Meyers was released to free agency and initially signed a one-year contract with Norwegian club, the Stavanger Oilers of the GET-ligaen on June 25, 2015. On July 15, 2015, Meyers retired from professional hockey.

== Awards and honors ==
Award	Year
All-WCHA Third Team	2008–09
WCHA All-Tournament Team	2009
