= 2008–09 Wisconsin Badgers women's ice hockey season =

NCAA Division I National Champions WCHA Tournament Champions NCAA Championship Game, W 5–0 vs. Mercyhurst
- Conference: 2nd WCHA
- Home ice: Kohl Center

Rankings
- USA Today/USA Hockey Magazine: #1
- USCHO.com/CBS College Sports: #1

Record
- Overall: 34–2–5
- Home: 18–0–2
- Road: 8–2–3
- Neutral: 8–0–0

Coaches and captains
- Head coach: Mark Johnson
- Captain: Erika Lawler
- Alternate captain(s): Meghan Duggan; Alycia Matthews

The 2008–09 Wisconsin Badgers women's ice hockey team was the Badgers' 9th season. Led by head coach Mark Johnson, the Badgers went 21–2–5 in the WCHA.

== Regular season ==
On October 18, the Badgers beat Bemidji State in the United States Hockey Hall of Fame Game.

=== Roster ===
Number	Player	Position	Class	Height
20	Ammerman, Brooke,	F	Fr	5–8
16	Bible, Rachel,	F	Sr	5–6
9	Deluce, Mallory,	F	So	5–7
26	Dronen, Anne,	D	So	5–3
7	Duggan, Meghan(A),	F	Jr	5–9
14	Evans, Maria,	F	So	5–4
12	Giles, Jasmine,	F	Jr	5–7
10	Hagen, Kayla,	F	Sr	5–5
4	Haverstock, Brittany,	D	Fr	5–6
3	Jakiel, Olivia,	D	So	5–10
29	Kaasa, Nikki,	G	Fr	5–10
21	Keseley, Angie,	F	Sr	5–7
23	Knight, Hilary,	F	So	5–11
17	Kranz, Emily,	F	Jr	5–7
13	Lawler, Erika(C),	F	Sr	5–0
19	Matthews, Alycia(A),	D	Sr	5–8
35	McCready, Alannah,	G	Jr	5–6
2	Nash, Kelly,	So |5–6		
27	Prévost, Carolyne,	F	Fr	
11	Sanders, Kyla,	F	Jr	5–6
30	Jessie Vetter	G	Sr	5–8
22	Windmeier, Malee,	D	So	5–9

== Player stats ==
=== Skaters ===
= Indicates team leader

Player	GP	Goals	Assists	Points	Penalty Minutes	GW	PP	SH
Brooke Ammerman	40	27	27	54	22	6	7	0
Rachel Bible	41	3	4	7	70	2	1	0
Mallory Deluce	41	12	20	32	53	2	4	2
Anne Dronen	41	4	5	9	22	1	0	0
Meghan Duggan	41	23	33	56	44	4	7	0
Maria Evans	21	1	2	3	4	0	0	0
Jasmine Giles	41	16	29	45	44	1	6	3
Kayla Hagen	24	0	0	0	4	0	0	0
Brittany Haverstock	39	2	15	17	16	1	0	0
Olivia Jakiel	41	0	9	9	22	0	0	0
Angie Keseley	41	18	41	59	22	4	7	0
Hilary Knight	39	45	38	83	24	6	16	2
Emily Kranz	41	1	1	2	10	0	0	0
Erika Lawler	40	20	44	64	37	4	7	3
Alycia Matthews	41	3	22	25	20	0	2	0
Alannah McCready	5	0	0	0	0	0	0	0
Kelly Nash	41	7	13	20	22	0	5	0
Carolyne Prévost	41	13	13	26	0	2	3	0
Kyla Sanders	41	10	17	27	12	1	1	3
Jessie Vetter	40	0	1	1	2	0	0	0
Malee Windmeier	40	2	11	13	36	0	1	0

=== Goaltenders ===
Player	Games Played	Minutes	Goals Against	Wins	Losses	Ties	Shutouts	Save %	Goals Against Average
Jessie Vetter	40	2342	49	33	2	5	14	.942	1.25
Alannah McCready	5	137	4	1	0	0	0	.909	1.75

== Schedule and results ==
Green Background indicates a win. Red Background indicates a loss. White Background indicates an overtime tie/loss. * Non-Conference Game. (SO) Shootout.

=== September 2008 ===
Record:2–0–0 Home:2–0–0 Away:0-0-0

#	Date	Visitor	Score	Home	OT	Decision	Attendance	Record	Pts
1	September 26	Quinnipiac	0–10	Wisconsin		Vetter	1,139	1–0–0–0	NC*
2	September 27	Quinnipiac	3–7	Wisconsin		McCready	1,258	2–0–0–0	NC*

=== October 2008 ===
Record:7–0–1 Home:3–0–1 Away:4–0–0

#	Date	Visitor	Score	Home	OT	Decision	Attendance	Record	Pts
3	October 3	Syracuse	0–3	Wisconsin		Vetter	1,216	3–0–0–0	NC*
4	October 4	Syracuse	0–8	Wisconsin		Vetter	1,187	4–0–0–0	NC*
5	October 10	Wisconsin	7–4	Ohio State		Vetter	432	5–0–0–0	2
6	October 11	Wisconsin	4–0	Ohio State		Vetter	314	6–0–0–0	4
7	October 17	Wisconsin	4–0	Bemidji State		Vetter	232	7–0–0–0	6
8	October 18	Wisconsin	9–0	Bemidji State		Vetter	212	8–0–0–0	8
9	October 24	Minnesota	1–1	Wisconsin	UM 1 – 0 UW (SO)	Vetter	1,216	8–0–1–0	9
10	October 26	Minnesota	1–2	Wisconsin		Vetter	2,046	9–0–1–0	11
11	October 31	Minnesota-Duluth	1–2	Wisconsin		Vetter	1,692	10–0–1–0	13

=== November 2008 ===
Record:6–0–1 Home:4–0–1 Away: 2–0–0

- The matches from November 21 and 22 were played in Fort Myers, Florida.

#	Date	Visitor	Score	Home	OT	Decision	Attendance	Record	Pts
12	November 1	Minnesota-Duluth	2–2	Wisconsin	UMD 0 – 1 UW (SO)	Vetter	1,237	10–0–2–1	15
13	November 15	Wisconsin	5–1	North Dakota		Vetter	437	11–0–2–1	17
14	November 16	Wisconsin	4–0	North Dakota		Vetter	394	12–0–2–1	19
15	November 21	New Hampshire	2–8	Wisconsin		Vetter	347	13–0–2–1	NC* (19)
16	November 22	New Hampshire	0–2	Wisconsin		Vetter	385	14–0–2–1	NC* (19)
17	November 28	Minnesota State	0–8	Wisconsin		Vetter	1,569	15–0–2–1	21
18	November 30	Minnesota State	2–7	Wisconsin		Vetter	1,875	16–0–2–1	23

=== December 2008 ===
Record:2–0–0 Home:2–0–0 Away: 0-0-0

#	Date	Visitor	Score	Home	OT	Decision	Attendance	Record	Pts
19	December 5	St. Cloud State	0–7	Wisconsin		Vetter	1,165	17–0–2–1	25
20	December 6	St. Cloud State	2–6	Wisconsin		Vetter	1,430	18–0–2–1	27

=== January 2009 ===
Record:4–1–1 Home:2–0–0 Away: 2–1–1

#	Date	Visitor	Score	Home	OT	Decision	Attendance	Record	Pts
--	January 2	Team USA	2–3	Wisconsin		Vetter	1,880	18–0–2–1	NC* (27)
21	January 10	Wisconsin	0–4	Minnesota-Duluth		Vetter	1,436	18–1–2–1	27
22	January 11	Wisconsin	3–3	Minnesota-Duluth	UW 0 – 2 UMD (SO)	Vetter	943	18–1–3–1	28
23	January 16	North Dakota	2–6	Wisconsin		Vetter	1,286	19–1–3–1	30
24	January 17	North Dakota	2–7	Wisconsin		Vetter	2,983	20–1–3–1	32
25	January 23	Wisconsin	5–1	St. Cloud State		Vetter	321	21–1–3–1	34
26	January 24	Wisconsin	6–3	St. Cloud State		Vetter	221	22–1–3–1	36
27	January 31	Ohio State	0–7	Wisconsin		Vetter	2,545	23–1–3–1	38

=== February 2009 ===
Record:0-0-0 Home:0-0-0 Away: 0-0-0

#	Date	Visitor	Score	Home	OT	Decision	Attendance	Record	Pts
28	February 1	Ohio State	0–7	Wisconsin		Vetter	2,789	24–1–3–1	40
29	February 7	Wisconsin	2–4	Minnesota		Vetter	2,562	24–2–3–1	40
30	February 8	Wisconsin	3–3	Minnesota	UW 1 – 0 UM (SO)	Vetter	2,895	24–2–4–2	42
31	February 13	Wisconsin	8–1	Minnesota State		_________	_______	25–2–4	__
32	February 14	Wisconsin	3–3	Minnesota State		_________	_______	25–2–5	__
33	February 20	Bemidji State	3–0	Wisconsin		_________	_______	26–2–5	__
34	February 21	Bemidji State	5–2	Wisconsin		_________	_______	27–2–5	__

== Postseason ==
=== NCAA Hockey tournament ===
- NCAA Frozen Four Semifinals (played in Boston, Ma.)
  - Wisconsin 5, Minnesota-Duluth 1
- NCAA Frozen Four Finals (played in Boston, Ma.)
  - Wisconsin 5, Mercyhurst 0
  - The game was played on March 22. Jessie Vetter stopped 37 shots for an NCAA record 14th shutout of the season (it was also her second in a national championship game) as Wisconsin won its third women's hockey title in four years with a 5–0 victory over Mercyhurst.

== Awards and honors ==
- Jessie Vetter, Patty Kazmaier Award

== See also ==
- 2008–09 Wisconsin Badgers men's ice hockey season
