= Alex Stalock =

American ice hockey player (born 1987)

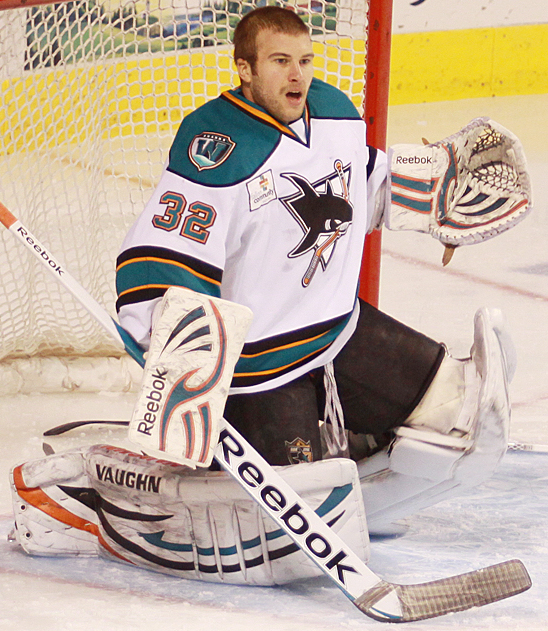
- Stalock with the Worcester Sharks in 2012
- Born: July 28, 1987 (age 39) Saint Paul, Minnesota, U.S.
- Height: 5 ft 11 in (180 cm)
- Weight: 170 lb (77 kg; 12 st 2 lb)
- Position: Goaltender
- Caught: Left
- Played for: San Jose Sharks; Minnesota Wild; Chicago Blackhawks
- NHL draft: 112th overall, 2005; San Jose Sharks
- Playing career: 2009–2024

Alexander Stalock (/ˈsteɪˌlɒk/ STAY-lok; born July 28, 1987) is an American sports commentator and former professional ice hockey goaltender. Stalock was originally drafted 112th overall in the 2005 NHL entry draft by the San Jose Sharks, and also played for the Minnesota Wild and Chicago Blackhawks. Following his playing career, Stalock began a broadcasting career with the Sharks as a radio color commentator.

== Playing career ==
Stalock was born in Saint Paul and played high school hockey for the South St. Paul, Minnesota Packers. He helped the Packers to an appearance in the state tournament in 2004, the team's first since 1996. Following that season, Stalock joined Cedar Rapids of the United States Hockey League (USHL) for two seasons. Stalock was named the 2005 USHL Playoff MVP as Cedar Rapids went on to win the Clark Cup. In 2006, he was named USHL Goaltender of the Year. He then attended University of Minnesota Duluth, where he played college hockey with the Minnesota Duluth Bulldogs for three years. In his first season with the Bulldogs, he was key to the team's appearance in the Western Collegiate Hockey Association (WCHA)'s Final Five championship. Stalock was named to the WCHA All-Rookie Team in 2007 and the NCAA West First All-American Team and the WCHA First All-Star Team in 2009.

=== Professional career ===
Stalock was drafted by the San Jose Sharks of the National Hockey League (NHL) in the fourth round, 112th overall, in the 2005 NHL entry draft. He played his first professional season with the Sharks American Hockey League (AHL) affiliate, the Worcester Sharks in the 2009–10 season, appearing in 61 games. He set a new AHL record for wins by a rookie (39) He was named to the AHL All-Rookie Team and represented Worcester at the AHL All-Star Classic. On February 1, 2011, he made his NHL debut in relief of Antti Niemi. Playing 29 minutes and 47 seconds, Stalock allowed no goals on nine shots to record his first NHL win in a 5–3 victory over the Phoenix Coyotes. Shortly after his debut he was reassigned to Worcester. In a game against the Manchester Monarchs on February 4, he suffered a sliced nerve behind his knee after being stepped on by the skate of Manchester's Dwight King, sidelining him for the remainder of the 2010–11 season. Afterwards, he had surgery to repair the nerve and went through many months of rehabilitation. Stalock was sidelined until January 21, 2012, when he started in goal for San Jose's ECHL affiliate, the Stockton Thunder. After six games in Stockton, Stalock was called up to Worcester. He was re-assigned on loan to the Peoria Rivermen, the AHL affiliate of the St. Louis Blues which had need of a goaltender after theirs had been traded to the Ottawa Senators. While with Peoria, he suffered a broken finger during practice.

On July 10, 2013, the Sharks re-signed Stalock to a one-year contract. In September 2013, Stalock was selected as the San Jose Sharks backup goaltender for the 2013–14 season. Stalock made his first NHL start on October 27, saving 38 shots in a 5–2 victory against the Ottawa Senators. On January 16, 2014, Stalock recorded his first shutout in a 3–0 win over the Florida Panthers. Against the Los Angeles Kings on January 27, Stalock passed Evgeni Nabokov for the Sharks' longest streak without allowing a goal with 178:55, 7:37 longer than Nabokov's highest. Stalock made his first career playoff start against the Los Angeles Kings on April 28, 2014.

In the 2015–16 season, on February 27, 2016, Stalock's tenure with the Sharks came to an end when he was traded, along with Ben Smith and a conditional fourth-round pick in 2018 to the Toronto Maple Leafs in exchange for James Reimer and Jeremy Morin. Stalock was placed on waivers the following day by the Maple Leafs and, upon clearing, was assigned to their AHL affiliate, the Toronto Marlies on February 29, 2016.

Stalock left the Maple Leafs organization as an unrestricted free agent in the off-season and on July 1, 2016, signed a one-year, two-way contract with the Minnesota Wild. He spent the entire season with Minnesota's AHL affiliate, the Iowa Wild. On February 2, 2017, the Wild signed Stalock to a two-year, $1.3 million extension. The contract allowed the Wild to protect starter Devan Dubnyk and expose Stalock in the 2017 NHL expansion draft. Stalock was not selected by the Vegas Golden Knights and remained with the Wild. Stalock made his Wild debut on March 31, 2017 in a 5–1 win over the Ottawa Senators. The following season he was made Dubnyk's backup with the departure of Darcy Kuemper. He earned his first shutout with the Wild, and in three seasons, against his former team, the Toronto Maple Leafs, on December 14, 2017. On December 6, 2018, Stalock appeared in his 100th game, a 2–0 loss to the Calgary Flames. On January 29, 2019, the Wild signed Stalock, to a three-year, $2.355 million extension. Stalock started the 2019–20 season as Dubnyk's backup again, but after Dubnyk struggled, Stalock was promoted to the starting goaltender in January. The season was disrupted by the pandemic when the NHL paused it on March 12. He started every game for the Wild in the Stanley Cup Playoffs Qualifiers Round that took place in Edmonton, Alberta. He earned his first playoff win in the first game of the series versus the Vancouver Canucks. However, the Canucks won the next three games, eliminating the Wild.

Rehabilitating an injury leading into the pandemic-delayed 2020–21 season, Stalock was placed on waivers by the Wild and later claimed by the Edmonton Oilers on March 1, 2021. He missed the entirety of the season through myocarditis, after contracting COVID-19. Returning to play in the 2021–22 season, Stalock was assigned to the Oilers' AHL affiliate, the Bakersfield Condors. He recorded three wins in five appearances before he was traded by the Oilers for future considerations in a return to his original club, the San Jose Sharks, on March 2, 2022. He appeared in one game with the Sharks, spending the rest of the season with the Sharks' AHL affiliate, the San Jose Barracuda.

On July 13, 2022, Stalock signed a one-year contract with the Chicago Blackhawks. Stalock ultimately played 27 games during the season, starting 24, with a 9–15–2 record and a .908 save percentage. He was named a finalist for the Bill Masterton Memorial Trophy, awarded to "the NHL player voted to best exemplify the qualities of perseverance, sportsmanship, and dedication to hockey." With Chicago, Stalock became the first goalie since the 1934–35 NHL season to stop a penalty shot in three consecutive games.

On August 7, 2023, Stalock signed as a free agent to a one-year, $800,000 contract with the Anaheim Ducks. Stalock was assigned to the Ducks AHL affiliate, the San Diego Gulls, for the 2023–24 season.

== Retirement ==
In mid-2024, Stalock retired from hockey and re-joined the San Jose Sharks organization as a color commentator on radio broadcasts. In October 2025, it was announced Stalock would join FanDuel Sports Network's coverage of the Minnesota Wild for select games during the 2025–26 NHL season.

== Career statistics ==
			Regular season									Playoffs
Season	Team	League	GP	W	L	T/OT	MIN	GA	SO	GAA	SV%	GP	W	L	MIN	GA	SO	GAA	SV%
2003–04	South Saint Paul	MNHS	31	23	7	1	1581	42	6	2.20	.924	—	—	—	—	—	—	—	—
2003–04	U.S. National Development Team	NAHL	2	—	—	—	—	—	—	4.50	.872	—	—	—	—	—	—	—	—
2004–05	Cedar Rapids RoughRiders	USHL	32	19	9	1	1801	82	1	2.73	.905	9	7	2	582	14	1	1.44	.950
2005–06	Cedar Rapids RoughRiders	USHL	44	28	13	3	2641	112	4	2.54	.931	8	3	5	472	25	0	3.18	.918
2006–07	University of Minnesota-Duluth	WCHA	23	5	14	3	1364	76	1	3.34	.881	—	—	—	—	—	—	—	—
2007–08	University of Minnesota-Duluth	WCHA	36	13	17	6	2170	85	3	2.35	.914	—	—	—	—	—	—	—	—
2008–09	University of Minnesota-Duluth	WCHA	42	21	13	8	2534	90	5	2.13	.924	—	—	—	—	—	—	—	—
2009–10	Worcester Sharks	AHL	61	39	19	2	3534	155	4	2.63	.908	11	6	5	683	26	0	2.28	.919
2010–11	Worcester Sharks	AHL	41	19	17	4	2397	105	0	2.63	.907	—	—	—	—	—	—	—	—
2010–11	San Jose Sharks	NHL	1	1	0	0	30	0	0	0.00	1.000	—	—	—	—	—	—	—	—
2011–12	Stockton Thunder	ECHL	6	5	1	0	360	17	0	2.83	.914	—	—	—	—	—	—	—	—
2011–12	Worcester Sharks	AHL	2	1	1	0	119	5	0	2.51	.909	—	—	—	—	—	—	—	—
2011–12	Peoria Rivermen	AHL	3	2	0	0	106	2	1	1.13	.964	—	—	—	—	—	—	—	—
2012–13	Worcester Sharks	AHL	38	17	16	4	2281	99	2	2.60	.912	—	—	—	—	—	—	—	—
2012–13	San Jose Sharks	NHL	2	0	0	1	42	2	0	2.86	.846	—	—	—	—	—	—	—	—
2013–14	San Jose Sharks	NHL	24	12	5	2	1251	39	2	1.87	.932	3	0	1	117	4	0	2.05	.929
2014–15	San Jose Sharks	NHL	22	8	9	2	1236	54	2	2.62	.902	—	—	—	—	—	—	—	—
2015–16	San Jose Sharks	NHL	13	3	5	2	670	33	0	2.94	.884	—	—	—	—	—	—	—	—
2015–16	San Jose Barracuda	AHL	2	2	0	0	122	4	0	1.96	.930	—	—	—	—	—	—	—	—
2015–16	Toronto Marlies	AHL	3	1	2	0	181	8	0	2.66	.907	—	—	—	—	—	—	—	—
2016–17	Iowa Wild	AHL	50	23	17	9	2871	109	4	2.28	.926	—	—	—	—	—	—	—	—
2016–17	Minnesota Wild	NHL	2	1	1	0	119	3	0	1.51	.944	—	—	—	—	—	—	—	—
2017–18	Minnesota Wild	NHL	28	10	10	4	1496	71	1	2.85	.910	1	0	0	49	1	0	1.25	.938
2018–19	Minnesota Wild	NHL	21	6	8	3	1066	53	0	2.99	.899	—	—	—	—	—	—	—	—
2019–20	Minnesota Wild	NHL	38	20	11	4	2178	97	4	2.67	.910	4	1	3	237	12	1	3.04	.897
2021–22	Bakersfield Condors	AHL	5	3	1	0	268	17	0	3.81	.862	—	—	—	—	—	—	—	—
2021–22	San Jose Sharks	NHL	1	0	1	0	46	6	0	7.81	.786	—	—	—	—	—	—	—	—
2021–22	San Jose Barracuda	AHL	12	1	8	2	698	47	1	4.04	.872	—	—	—	—	—	—	—	—
2022–23	Chicago Blackhawks	NHL	27	9	15	2	1476	74	2	3.01	.908	—	—	—	—	—	—	—	—
2023–24	San Diego Gulls	AHL	15	2	9	2	801	51	0	3.82	.888	—	—	—	—	—	—	—	—
NHL totals			179	70	65	20	9,613	432	11	2.70	.908	8	1	4	402	17	1	2.54	.910

== Awards and honors ==
Award	Year
USHL
Clark Cup (Cedar Rapids RoughRiders)	2004–05
College
All-WCHA Rookie Team	2006–07
All-WCHA First Team	2008–09
AHCA West First-Team All-American	2008–09
WCHA All-Tournament Team	2009

Awards and achievements
Preceded by Alex Kangas	WCHA Most Valuable Player in Tournament; 2009	Succeeded by Evan Trupp
