= MacGregor Sharp =

Canadian professional ice hockey centre (born 1985)

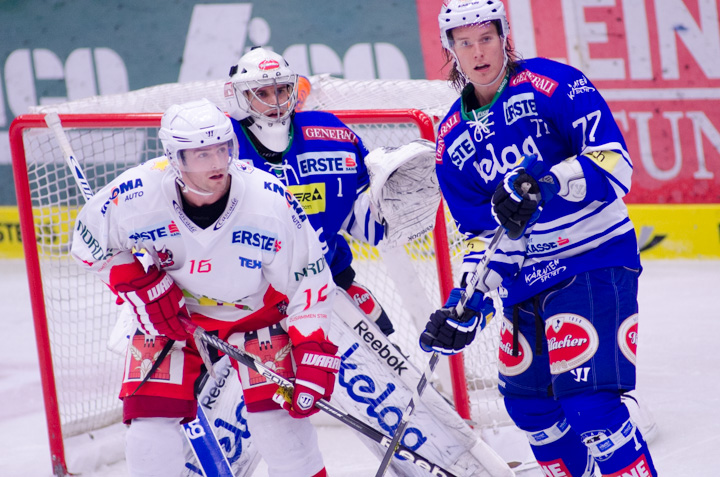
- Born: October 1, 1985 (age 40) Red Deer, Alberta, Canada
- Height: 6 ft 1 in (185 cm)
- Weight: 185 lb (84 kg; 13 st 3 lb)
- Position: Centre
- Shoots: Left
- Metal Ligaen team Former teams: SønderjyskE Ishockey; Anaheim Ducks; HC Bolzano; Schwenninger Wild Wings; Vienna Capitals
- NHL draft: Undrafted
- Playing career: 2009–present

MacGregor Donald Bartley Sharp (born October 1, 1985) is a Canadian professional ice hockey centre who is currently with the SønderjyskE Ishockey of the Metal Ligaen. He has previously played in the National Hockey League (NHL) for the Anaheim Ducks.

== Playing career ==
On March 31, 2009, Sharp signed a two-year, entry-level contract with the Anaheim Ducks of the National Hockey League (NHL).

Sharp became the first skater to jump from the ECHL to the National Hockey League (NHL) in the same season without first stopping in the American Hockey League (AHL), playing 15 games with the Bakersfield Condors earning 4 goals, and 10 assists. He played 8 games with the Anaheim Ducks going scoreless, before he was assigned to the San Antonio Rampage.

On February 28, 2011, Sharp was traded along with Maxim Lapierre to the Vancouver Canucks in exchange for Joel Perrault and a third round pick in the 2012 NHL entry draft.

On August 2, 2011, Sharp left North America and agreed to a contract with HC Bolzano of the then Italian Serie A. After two seasons amongst the Foxes top scorers, Sharp remained with the club as they transferred leagues into the Austrian Hockey League for a higher level of competitiveness.

On May 30, 2014, Sharp changed European leagues, agreeing to a one-year deal with Schwenninger Wild Wings of the Deutsche Eishockey Liga. In the 2014–15 season, Sharp struggled offensively with just 6 goals and 14 points in 47 games. He was not tendered a new contract upon Schwenninger failing to qualify for the post-season.

On April 15, 2015, Sharp opted to return in hope of further success in Austrian EBEL, signing a one-year deal with the Vienna Capitals.

On July 12, 2019, Sharp signed a one-year deal with SønderjyskE Ishockey of the Danish Metal Ligaen.

== Career statistics ==
			Regular season					Playoffs
Season	Team	League	GP	G	A	Pts	PIM	GP	G	A	Pts	PIM
2002–03	Camrose Kodiaks	AJHL	60	23	25	48	96	—	—	—	—	—
2003–04	Camrose Kodiaks	AJHL	44	20	26	46	45	—	—	—	—	—
2004–05	Camrose Kodiaks	AJHL	57	19	30	49	32	—	—	—	—	—
2005–06	University of Minnesota-Duluth	WCHA	40	6	8	14	31	—	—	—	—	—
2006–07	University of Minnesota-Duluth	WCHA	38	11	16	27	35	—	—	—	—	—
2007–08	University of Minnesota-Duluth	WCHA	36	7	10	17	14	—	—	—	—	—
2008–09	University of Minnesota-Duluth	WCHA	43	26	24	50	20	—	—	—	—	—
2008–09	Iowa Chops	AHL	6	1	1	2	4	—	—	—	—	—
2009–10	Bakersfield Condors	ECHL	17	4	12	16	10	10	3	5	8	10
2009–10	Anaheim Ducks	NHL	8	0	0	0	0	—	—	—	—	—
2009–10	San Antonio Rampage	AHL	40	9	9	18	16	—	—	—	—	—
2010–11	Syracuse Crunch	AHL	50	6	7	13	26	—	—	—	—	—
2010–11	Abbotsford Heat	AHL	17	1	1	2	7	—	—	—	—	—
2011–12	HC Bolzano	ITL	42	22	24	46	42	12	7	10	17	14
2012–13	HC Bolzano	ITL	43	13	34	47	16	6	2	2	4	2
2013–14	HC Bolzano	EBEL	42	18	14	32	28	13	9	2	11	4
2014–15	Schwenninger Wild Wings	DEL	47	6	8	14	32	—	—	—	—	—
2015–16	Vienna Capitals	EBEL	49	19	14	33	27	5	1	1	2	2
2016–17	Vienna Capitals	EBEL	52	22	19	41	14	12	3	4	7	2
NHL totals			8	0	0	0	0	—	—	—	—	—

== Awards and honors ==
Award	Year
WCHA All-Tournament Team	2009
