= 2008–09 Wisconsin Badgers men's ice hockey season =

Badger Hockey Showdown Champions
- Conference: 3rd WCHA
- Home ice: Kohl Center

Rankings
- USA Today/USA Hockey Magazine: —
- USCHO.com/CBS College Sports: #17

Record
- Overall: 20–16–4
- Home: 12–8–2
- Road: 7–7–2
- Neutral: 1–1–0

Coaches and captains
- Head coach: Mike Eaves
- Captain: Blake Geoffrion
- Alternate captain(s): Jamie McBain; Ryan McDonagh; Ben Street

The 2008–09 Wisconsin Badgers men's ice hockey team was the Badgers' 56th season. They represent the University of Wisconsin–Madison in the 2008–09 NCAA Division I men's ice hockey season. The team is coached by Mike Eaves and play their home games at Kohl Center.

== Regular season ==
=== Standings ===
2008–09 Western Collegiate Hockey Association standings
	Conference							Overall					
	GP	W	L	T	PTS	GF	GA	GP	W	L	T	GF	GA
#13 North Dakota†	28	17	7	4	38	96	74	43	24	15	4	146	118
#7 Denver	28	16	8	4	36	96	68	40	23	12	5	132	96
Wisconsin	28	14	11	3	31	92	78	40	20	16	4	131	106
Colorado College	28	12	9	7	31	79	82	38	16	12	10	103	103
Minnesota	28	12	11	5	29	87	83	37	17	13	7	119	105
St. Cloud State	28	13	13	2	28	83	81	38	18	17	3	122	107
#8 Minnesota–Duluth*	28	10	11	7	27	78	72	43	22	13	8	128	98
Minnesota State	28	11	13	4	26	88	90	38	15	17	6	117	122
Alaska–Anchorage	28	9	14	5	23	69	93	36	14	17	5	95	111
Michigan Tech	28	2	19	7	11	47	94	38	6	25	7	62	122
Championship: Minnesota–Duluth † indicates conference regular season champion * indicates conference tournament champion Final rankings: USA Today/USA Hockey Magazine Top 15 Poll

=== Schedule and results ===
- Green background indicates win (2 points).
- Red background indicates loss (0 points).
- White background indicates tie (1 point).

2008–09 Game Log

October: 0–6–1 (Home: 0–1–1; Road: 0–5–0)
#	Date	Visitor	Score	Home	OT	Decision	Attendance	WCHA	Overall	Recap
1†	October 10	Wisconsin	4–5	Boston College		Connelly	7,884	0–0–0	0–1–0
2†	October 11	Wisconsin	1–5	New Hampshire		Gudmandson	6,501	0–0–0	0–2–0
3	October 17	Wisconsin	5–6	Denver		Connelly	6,036	0–1–0	0–3–0
4	October 18	Wisconsin	4–7	Denver		Gudmandson	6,095	0–2–0	0–4–0
5	October 24	Minnesota	2–2	Wisconsin		Connelly	13,184	0–2–1	0–4–1
6	October 25	Minnesota	5–2	Wisconsin		Connelly	15,237	0–3–1	0–5–1
7	October 31	Wisconsin	2–3	North Dakota		Connelly	11,684	0–4–1	0–6–1

November: 7–1–1 (Home: 4–0–0; Road: 3–1–1)
#	Date	Visitor	Score	Home	OT	Decision	Attendance	WCHA	Overall	Recap
8	November 1	Wisconsin	5–2	North Dakota		Connelly	11,748	1–4–1	1–6–1
9	November 7	Michigan Tech	2–3	Wisconsin		Connelly	12,474	2–4–1	2–6–1
10	November 8	Michigan Tech	0–6	Wisconsin		Gudmandson	14,210	3–4–1	3–6–1
11	November 14	Wisconsin	3–3	Minnesota-Duluth		Connelly	4,534	3–4–2	3–6–2
12	November 15	Wisconsin	4–1	Minnesota-Duluth		Connelly	4,751	4–4–2	4–6–2
13	November 21	Wisconsin	2–6	St. Cloud State		Connelly	6,010	4–5–2	4–7–2
14	November 22	Wisconsin	1–0	St. Cloud State		Connelly	6,021	5–5–2	5–7–2
15†*	November 28	Michigan State	1–3	Wisconsin		Connelly	12,695	5–5–2	6–7–2
16†*	November 29	Michigan	0–3	Wisconsin		Connelly	14,025	5–5–2	7–7–2

December: 3–0–1 (Home: 3–0–1; Road: 0–0–0)
#	Date	Visitor	Score	Home	OT	Decision	Attendance	WCHA	Overall	Recap
17	December 5	Alaska-Anchorage	2–3	Wisconsin		Connelly	12,268	6–5–2	8–7–2
18	December 6	Alaska-Anchorage	2–7	Wisconsin		Connelly	14,023	7–5–2	9–7–2
19†^	December 27	Alabama-Huntsville	0–5	Wisconsin		Connelly	12,887	7–5–2	10–7–2
20†^	December 28	Lake Superior State	1–1	Wisconsin		Connelly	13,422	7–5–2	10–7–3

January: 4–4–0 (Home: 2–4–0; Road: 2–0–0)
#	Date	Visitor	Score	Home	OT	Decision	Attendance	WCHA	Overall	Recap
21	January 2	Northern Michigan	3-2	Wisconsin		Connelly	14,518	7–5–2	10–8–3
22	January 3	Northern Michigan	6–5	Wisconsin	OT	Connelly	13,924	7–5–2	10–9–3
23	January 9	Wisconsin	3–2	Alaska-Anchorage		Connelly	3,043	8–5–2	11–9–3
24	January 10	Wisconsin	6–3	Alaska-Anchorage		Connelly	4,150	9–5–2	12–9–3
25	January 16	Colorado College	1–6	Wisconsin		Connelly	12,849	10–5–2	13–9–3
26	January 17	Colorado College	4–3	Wisconsin		Connelly	15,237	10–6–2	13–10–3
27	January 30	Minnesota-Duluth	1–3	Wisconsin		Connelly	14,144	11–6–2	14–10–3
28	January 31	Minnesota-Duluth	1–0	Wisconsin		Connelly	15,237	11–7–2	14–11–3

February: 2–3–1 (Home: 0–2–0; Road: 2–1–1)
#	Date	Visitor	Score	Home	OT	Decision	Attendance	WCHA	Overall	Recap
29	February 6	Wisconsin	3–2	Minnesota		Connelly	10,201	12–7–2	15–11–3
30	February 7	Wisconsin	5–4	Minnesota		Connelly	10,217	13–7–2	16–11–3
31	February 20	Denver	4–3	Wisconsin	OT	Connelly	13,940	13–8–2	16–12–3
32	February 21	Denver	5–0	Wisconsin		Connelly	15,237	13–9–2	16–13–3
33	February 27	Wisconsin	3–4	Minnesota State	OT	Connelly	4,774	13–10–2	16–14–3
34	February 28	Wisconsin	3–3	Minnesota State		Connelly	5,013	13–10–3	16–14–4

March: 4–2–0 (Home: 3–1–0; Road: 0–0–0; Neutral: 1–1–0)
#	Date	Visitor	Score	Home	OT	Decision	Attendance	WCHA	Overall	Recap
35	March 6	North Dakota	2–1	Wisconsin		Connelly	14,179	13–11–3	16–15–4
36	March 7	North Dakota	1–4	Wisconsin		Connelly	15,237	14–11–3	17–15–4
37†°	March 13	Minnesota State	1–7	Wisconsin		Connelly	11,291	14–11–3	18–15–4
38†°	March 14	Minnesota State	2–4	Wisconsin		Connelly	13,043	14–11–3	19–15–4
39†“	March 20	Wisconsin	0–3	Denver		Connelly	14,722	14–11–3	19–16–4
40†×	March 20	Wisconsin	4–1	North Dakota		Connelly	15,254	14–11–3	20–16–4

† Denotes a non-conference game

* Denotes College Hockey Showcase

^ Denotes Badger Showdown

° Denotes 2009 WCHA Men's Ice Hockey Tournament first round

“ Denotes 2009 WCHA Men's Ice Hockey Tournament semifinals (neutral site: Xcel Energy Center, Saint Paul, Minnesota)

× Denotes 2009 WCHA Men's Ice Hockey Tournament third place (neutral site: Xcel Energy Center, Saint Paul, Minnesota)

== Player stats ==
=== Skaters ===
Note: GP = Games played; G = Goals; A = Assists; Pts = Points; +/- = Plus–minus; PIM = Penalty minutes

Player	GP	G	A	Pts	PIM
Jamie McBain	30	7	27	34	20
Derek Stepan	30	6	18	24	6
John Mitchell	30	13	8	21	95
Tom Gorowsky	26	9	12	21	0
Blake Geoffrion	27	11	8	19	41
Brendan Smith	21	7	11	18	40
Andy Bohmbach	29	8	9	17	20
Michael Davies	24	6	11	17	14
Jake Gardiner	29	2	15	17	14
Ryan McDonagh	26	4	8	12	45
Jordy Murray	30	6	5	11	38
Ben Grotting	25	2	8	10	21
Sean Dolan	26	4	5	9	28
Matt Thurber	24	2	5	7	20
Podge Turnbull	23	4	2	6	24
Patrick Johnson	25	2	3	5	38
Aaron Bendickson	24	2	2	4	14
Eric Springer	16	1	2	3	14
Ryan Little	22	0	3	3	12
Ben Street	4	1	0	1	8
Chris Hickey	8	1	0	1	4
Tom Bardis	3	0	0	0	0
Craig Johnson	13	0	0	0	0

=== Goaltenders ===
Note: GP = Games played; TOI = Time on ice; W = Wins; L = Losses; T = Ties; GA = Goals against; SO = Shutouts; SV% = Save percentage; GAA = Goals against average; G = Goals; A = Assists; PIM = Penalty minutes

Player	GP	TOI	W	L	T	GA	SO	Sv%	GAA	G	A	PIM
Shane Connelly	27	1630	15	9	3	68	3	.913	2.50	0	1	0
Scott Gudmandson	3	179	1	2	0	12	1	.882	4.01	0	0	0

== See also ==
- 2008–09 Wisconsin Badgers women's ice hockey season
