= Matt Francis =

Canadian professional ice hockey player

- Born: September 27, 1985 (age 39); Surrey, British Columbia, Canada
- Height: 5 ft 10 in (178 cm)
- Weight: 176 lb (80 kg; 12 st 8 lb)
- Position: Forward
- Shoots: Right
- EIHL team Former teams: Nottingham Panthers; AHL; Worcester Sharks; ECHL; Gwinnett Gladiators
- NHL draft: Undrafted
- Playing career: 2009–present

Matt Francis (born September 27, 1985) is a Canadian professional ice hockey player who played with the Nottingham Panthers of the Elite Ice Hockey League for three seasons.
