= 2006–07 Wisconsin Badgers women's ice hockey season =

NCAA Division I National Champions WCHA Regular Season Champions WCHA Tournament Champions NCAA Championship Game, W 4–1 vs. Minnesota–Duluth
- Conference: 1st WCHA

Rankings
- USA Today/USA Hockey Magazine: #1
- USCHO.com/CBS College Sports: #1

Record
- Overall: 31–1–4
- Home: 19–1–1
- Road: 13–0–3
- Neutral: 4–0–0

Coaches and captains
- Head coach: Mark Johnson

The Badgers were led by Mark Johnson, who was in his fifth season with the Badgers. The club had a 31–1–4 overall record, and a 23–1–4 conference record. The Badgers won their second straight WCHA regular season title and NCAA title.

== Regular season ==
Numeours accolades were bestowed upon the Badgers players. Bauer was named one of the 2006–07 all-league forwards. Senior Meghan Mikkelson was one of the all-WCHA defenseman while Wisconsin sophomore Jessie Vetter was voted the all-league goalie. Sara Bauer was named the WCHA Player of the Year for the second straight season. She captured the conference scoring race with 51 points in 28 WCHA games. She scored 16 goals and added 35 assists. Bauer was third in the NCAA scoring race during the regular season with 62 points in 34 games. She was second in the country with 40 assists, tied for 13th with 22 goals, ranked fifth in the nation with 1.82 points per game and third with 1.18 assists per game. Meghan Mikkelson was selected as the WCHA Defensive Player of the Year. This marked the fourth consecutive year that the award was won by a player from Wisconsin. Mikkelson succeeded teammate Bobbi-Jo Slusar, a two-time winner, as the top defender. Jessie Vetter and Christine Dufour combined for 15 shutouts. Vetter was voted the top goalie and had a 1.24 goals-against average and a save percentage of .932. Wisconsin's Meghan Duggan was named the 2006–07 WCHA Rookie of the Year. She was ranked first among league rookies in scoring with 34 points and also led the freshman class with 17 goals. She was the fourth leading scorer in the WCHA overall. Duggan tallied five WCHA weekly honors overall, the most ever by a UW player in a single season. Mark Johnson was awarded WCHA Coach of the Year for the second straight year. Johnson is the son of the late Badgers' men's coach (and Stanley Cup champion) Bob Johnson, and has a career record of 142–28–14.

== Postseason ==
- The No. 1-ranked Badgers reached the Frozen Four for the second time ever by defeating No. 6-ranked Harvard, 1–0, in four overtimes in an NCAA quarterfinal. It was played on March 10 at the Kohl Center and the game attracted the second most fans to ever watch a women's college hockey game – a crowd of 5,125.

The game-winning goal was scored by Junior Jinelle Zaugg. She received a pass from Sara Bauer that went over Harvard goalie Brittany Martin's shoulder to end the game after 127 minutes and :09 seconds of play. The Badgers' seven-period game ranks as the second longest game in NCAA history, the longest played in 1996 when New Hampshire defeated Providence 3–2 in five overtimes.

- 2007 NCAA Women's Frozen Four: All games were played at Herb Brooks Arena at Lake Placid, New York
- Friday, March 16 • Semi-Finals Wisconsin 4, St. Lawrence 0
- Sunday, March 18 • Wisconsin 4, Minnesota-Duluth 1

== Awards and honors ==
- Sara Bauer, Finalist for the 2007 Patty Kazmaier Award
- Sara Bauer, WCHA Player of the Year
- Sara Bauer, All-WCHA First Team
- Sara Bauer, WCHA Scoring Champion
- Christine Dufour, Goaltender, All-WCHA Third Team
- Christine Dufour, Goaltending Champion
- Meghan Duggan, Forward, WCHA All Rookie team
- Meghan Duggan, WCHA Rookie of the Year
- Meghan Duggan, Forward, All-WCHA Second Team
- Meghan Duggan earned three consecutive WCHA Rookie of the Week honors, becoming the first Badger to ever win a conference award in three straight weeks
- Meghan Duggan was named USCHO.com Offensive Player of the Week on Oct. 23
- Mark Johnson, WCHA Coach of Year
- Erika Lawler, Forward, All-WCHA Third Team
- Meghan Mikkelson, All-WCHA defenseman
- Meghan Mikkelson, All-WCHA First Team
- Meghan Mikkelson, WCHA Defensive Player of the Year
- Meghan Mikkelson, Top 10 candidates for the 2007 Patty Kazmaier Award
- Bobbi-Jo Slusar, Defense, Forward, All-WCHA Second Team
- Jessie Vetter, WCHA Goalie of the Year
- Jessie Vetter, Goaltender, All-WCHA First Team
- Jinelle Zaugg, Forward, All-WCHA Second Team
- 2006–07 All-WCHA Academic Team
  - Sara Bauer, Sr.
  - Rachel Bible, So.
  - Angie Keseley, So.
  - Heidi Kletzien, Sr.
  - Meaghan Mikkelson, Sr.
  - Phoebe Monteleone, Sr.
  - Jessie Vetter, So.
