= 2008–09 NCAA Division I men's ice hockey rankings =

- NCAA tournament: 2009
- NCAA champion: Boston University
- Preseason No. 1 (USA Today): Boston College
- Preseason No. 1 (USCHO): Boston College
- NCAA Division I men's ice hockey rankings

Two human polls made up the 2008–09 NCAA Division I men's ice hockey rankings, the USCHO.com/CBS College Sports poll and the USA Today/USA Hockey Magazine poll. As the 2008–09 season progressed, rankings were updated weekly.

== Legend ==
	Increase in ranking
	Decrease in ranking
	Not ranked previous week
(Italics)	Number of first place votes
#–#–#	Win–loss–tie record
†	Tied with team above or below also with this symbol

== USA Today/USA Hockey Magazine ==
	Preseason Sep 22	Week 1 Oct 6	Week 2 Oct 13	Week 3 Oct 20	Week 4 Oct 27	Week 5 Nov 3	Week 6 Nov 10	Week 7 Nov 17	Week 8 Nov 24	Week 9 Dec 1	Week 10 Dec 8	Week 11 Dec 15	Week 12 Jan 5	Week 13 Jan 12	Week 14 Jan 19	Week 15 Jan 26	Week 16 Feb 2	Week 16 Feb 9	Week 18 Feb 16	Week 19 Feb 23	Week 20 Mar 2	Week 21 Mar 9	Week 22 Mar 16	Week 23 Mar 23	Week 24 Mar 30	Final Apr 13	
1	Boston College (27)	Boston College (26) 0–0–0	Boston College (32) 1–0–0	Colorado College (31) 4–0–0	Colorado College (30) 4–0–2	Colorado College (28) 5–0–3	Boston University (19) 6–1–0	Minnesota (34) 6–0–4	Minnesota (30) 7–1–4	Notre Dame (33) 10–3–2	Notre Dame (30) 12–3–2	Notre Dame (30) 14–3–2	Notre Dame (32) 16–3–2	Notre Dame (30) 18–3–2	Notre Dame (22) 19–3–3	Notre Dame (21) 19–3–3	Boston University (27) 19–5–1	Boston University (34) 21–5–1	Boston University (31) 23–5–2	Notre Dame (18) 25–5–3	Boston University (26) 25–5–4	Boston University (26) 27–5–4	Boston University (19) 29–6–4	Boston University (22) 31–6–4	Boston University (34) 33–6–4	Boston University (34) 35–6–4	1
2	Michigan (4)	Michigan (4) 0–0–0	Michigan (1) 2–0–0	Denver (1) 3–0–0	Boston College (3) 3–1–0	Boston College (5) 5–1–0	Minnesota (10) 5–0–3	Boston University; 7–2–0	Notre Dame; 9–3–1	Minnesota (1) 7–2–5	Minnesota (2) 7–2–5	Miami (OH) (4) 12–3–3	Boston University (1) 13–4–1	Boston University (2) 14–4–1	Boston University (6) 16–5–1	Boston University (13) 18–5–1	Notre Dame (7) 20–4–3	Northeastern (1) 19–6–2	Notre Dame (3) 23–5–3	Boston University (16) 23–5–4	Notre Dame (8) 27–5–3	Notre Dame (8) 27–5–3	Notre Dame (15) 29–5–3	Notre Dame (12) 31–5–3	Notre Dame; 31–6–3	Miami (OH); 23–13–5	2
3	Notre Dame	Colorado College (4) 0–0–0	Colorado College (1) 2–0–0	New Hampshire (1) 3–0–0	Boston University; 4–1–0	Boston University (1) 5–1–0	Colorado College (5) 6–1–3	Colorado College; 7–2–3	Colorado College (1) 8–3–3	Boston College; 9–4–1	Miami (OH) (2) 10–3–3	Boston University; 11–4–1	Minnesota; 10–3–5	Northeastern; 14–4–2	Cornell (6) 13–1–3	Northeastern; 17–5–2	Northeastern; 17–6–2	Notre Dame; 21–5–3	Michigan; 23–9–0	Michigan; 24–10–0	Michigan; 26–10–0	Michigan; 26–10–0	Michigan; 28–10–0	Michigan; 29–11–0	Vermont; 22–11–5	Vermont; 22–12–5	3
4	North Dakota (1)	Notre Dame; 0–0–0	Denver; 1–0–0	Boston College (1) 2–1–0	Denver; 4–1–0	Minnesota; 4–0–2	Denver; 6–2–1	Boston College; 6–3–1	Northeastern; 9–2–2	Miami (OH); 8–3–3	Boston University; 10–4–1	Minnesota; 8–3–5	Northeastern; 12–4–2	Denver; 15–6–2	Denver; 15–6–2	Cornell; 14–2–3	Michigan; 19–9–0	Michigan; 21–9–0	Miami (OH); 18–8–4	Northeastern; 20–8–4	Northeastern; 22–8–4	Northeastern; 23–9–4	Denver; 22–10–5	Denver; 23–11–5	Miami (OH); 22–12–5	Notre Dame; 31–6–3	4
5	Colorado College (2)	North Dakota; 0–0–0	Boston University; 2–0–0	Michigan; 3–1–0	Minnesota (1) 3–0–1	New Hampshire; 4–1–2	New Hampshire; 4–2–3	Northeastern; 7–2–2	Miami (OH) (1) 8–3–3	Boston University; 9–4–0	Denver; 11–5–1	Denver; 13–5–1	Princeton; 13–3–0	Cornell (2) 11–1–3	Northeastern; 15–5–2	Minnesota; 12–5–5	Cornell; 14–3–4	Vermont; 16–6–4	Northeastern; 20–8–2	Denver; 19–9–4	Denver; 20–10–4	Denver; 20–10–5	North Dakota; 24–12–4	Yale; 24–7–2	Michigan; 29–12–0	Michigan; 29–12–0	5
6	Denver	Denver; 0–0–0	New Hampshire; 1–0–0	Minnesota; 2–0–0	Miami (OH); 3–1–2	Denver; 4–2–1	Boston College; 5–3–0	Notre Dame; 7–3–1	Boston College; 7–4–1	Colorado College; 9–4–3	Northeastern; 11–3–2	Northeastern; 11–3–2	Cornell (1) 9–1–3	Michigan; 15–7–0	Minnesota; 12–5–5	Vermont; 14–5–4	Miami (OH); 16–8–4	Miami (OH); 16–8–4	Vermont; 17–7–4	Princeton; 20–7–0	North Dakota; 21–11–4	North Dakota; 22–12–4	Northeastern; 25–10–4	Northeastern; 25–11–4	New Hampshire; 20–13–5	New Hampshire; 20–13–5	6
7	New Hampshire	New Hampshire; 0–0–0	Miami (OH); 1–0–1	Boston University; 3–1–0	New Hampshire; 3–1–1	Michigan; 6–2–0	Northeastern; 6–1–2	Miami (OH); 6–3–3	Princeton (1) 7–1–0	Denver; 9–5–1	Princeton; 10–2–0	Boston College; 9–5–2	Denver; 13–6–2	Vermont; 12–4–3	Vermont; 13–5–3	Michigan; 18–8–0	Vermont; 14–6–4	Cornell; 15–4–4	Yale; 19–5–1	North Dakota; 20–11–3	Vermont; 19–8–5	Vermont; 20–9–5	Yale; 22–7–2	North Dakota; 24–14–4	Denver; 23–12–5	Denver; 23–12–5	7
8	Miami (OH)	Miami (OH); 0–0–0	Notre Dame; 0–1–0	Notre Dame; 2–1–0	Michigan; 4–2–0	Miami (OH); 4–2–2	Michigan; 7–3–0	Princeton; 5–1–0	Boston University; 7–4–0	Northeastern; 10–3–2	Boston College; 9–5–2	Princeton; 10–2–0	Miami (OH); 12–5–3	Minnesota; 10–5–5	Michigan; 16–8–0	Denver; 15–7–3	Denver; 16–8–3	Denver; 17–9–3	Denver; 17–9–4	Vermont; 17–8–5	Miami (OH); 19–10–5	Miami (OH); 19–10–5	Princeton; 22–10–0	Minnesota-Duluth; 21–12–8	Minnesota-Duluth; 22–13–8	Minnesota-Duluth; 22–13–8	8
9	Minnesota	Boston University; 0–0–0	Minnesota; 0–0–0	Princeton; 0–0–0	Northeastern; 5–0–1	Princeton; 1–0–0	Notre Dame; 6–3–0	Michigan; 8–4–0	Minnesota State; 7–3–2	Princeton; 9–2–0	Cornell; 7–1–2	Cornell; 7–1–2	Boston College; 9–5–2	Miami (OH); 12–7–3	Princeton; 13–5–0	Princeton; 13–5–0	Minnesota; 12–7–5	Princeton; 17–6–0	North Dakota; 18–11–3	Miami (OH); 18–9–5	New Hampshire; 18–9–5	New Hampshire; 19–10–5	Vermont; 20–11–5	Cornell; 21–9–4	Cornell; 22–10–4	Bemidji State; 20–16–1	9
10	Boston University	Minnesota; 0–0–0	St. Cloud State; 2–0–0	Miami (OH); 1–1–2	Princeton; 0–0–0	Northeastern; 5–1–2	Miami (OH); 4–3–3	Denver; 6–4–1	Denver; 7–5–1	Air Force; 13–1–1	Colorado College; 9–5–4	Colorado College; 10–6–4	Vermont; 11–4–2	Princeton; 13–5–0	Miami (OH); 13–8–3	Miami (OH); 14–8–4	Princeton; 15–6–0	Yale; 17–5–1	Princeton; 18–7–0	New Hampshire; 16–9–5	Yale; 20–7–2	Yale; 20–7–2	Cornell; 20–8–4	Vermont; 20–11–5	North Dakota; 24–15–4	Yale; 24–8–2	10
11	Clarkson	Michigan State; 0–0–0	Michigan State; 1–1–0	Northeastern; 3–0–1	Minnesota State; 3–1–0	Michigan State; 4–2–2	Princeton; 2–1–0	Minnesota State; 5–3–2	Air Force (1) 12–0–0	Minnesota State; 8–3–3	Vermont; 9–3–2	Michigan; 11–7–0	Michigan; 13–7–0	Colorado College; 12–7–5	Ohio State; 16–6–2	Boston College; 11–8–3	New Hampshire; 12–8–4	North Dakota; 16–11–3	Cornell; 15–6–4	Cornell; 17–6–4	Princeton; 20–9–0	Princeton; 20–9–0	Minnesota; 17–12–7	Princeton; 22–11–1	Northeastern; 25–12–4	Northeastern; 25–12–4	11
12	Michigan State	Princeton; 0–0–0	Princeton; 0–0–0	Vermont; 2–0–1	Michigan State; 3–2–1	Notre Dame; 4–3–0	Minnesota State; 4–2–2	Air Force; 10–0–0	Cornell; 4–0–2	Vermont; 9–3–2	Michigan; 11–7–0	Air Force; 14–2–0	Colorado College; 11–6–5	Boston College; 9–6–3	New Hampshire; 11–6–4	North Dakota; 15–10–3	Boston College; 11–8–4	New Hampshire; 13–9–4	New Hampshire; 14–9–5	Yale; 19–6–2	Cornell; 18–7–4	Cornell; 18–7–4	New Hampshire; 19–12–5	New Hampshire; 19–12–5	Bemidji State; 20–15–1	Cornell; 22–10–4	12
13	Wisconsin	Clarkson; 0–0–0	North Dakota; 0–2–0	Minnesota State; 3–1–0	Notre Dame; 2–3–0	Minnesota State; 3–2–1	Air Force; 8–0–0	New Hampshire; 4–4–3	Vermont; 7–3–2	Cornell; 5–1–2	Air Force; 14–2–0	Vermont; 9–4–2	New Hampshire; 9–6–3	New Hampshire; 10–6–4	Colorado College; 13–8–5	Ohio State; 16–7–3	North Dakota; 16–11–3	Wisconsin; 16–11–3	Wisconsin; 16–11–3	Colorado College; 16–9–8	St. Lawrence; 19–11–4	Colorado College; 16–10–10	Miami (OH); 20–12–5	Miami (OH); 20–12–5	Yale; 24–8–2	North Dakota; 24–15–4	13
14	Northern Michigan	Wisconsin; 0–0–0	Clarkson; 0–0–0	Michigan State; 2–2–0	Clarkson; 1–1–2	Air Force; 8–0–0	Cornell; 1–0–1	Cornell; 2–0–2	Nebraska-Omaha; 9–2–1	Michigan; 9–7–0	Minnesota State; 8–5–3	New Hampshire; 8–6–3	Air Force; 15–4–1	Ohio State; 15–6–1	Boston College; 9–8–3	New Hampshire; 11–8–4	Yale; 15–5–1	Minnesota; 12–9–5	Minnesota; 13–9–6	Minnesota-Duluth; 16–9–7	Ohio State; 20–12–4	Ohio State; 22–12–4	St. Lawrence; 21–11–4	Massachusetts-Lowell; 20–16–2	Air Force; 28–11–2	Air Force; 28–11–2	14
15	St. Cloud State	St. Cloud State; 0–0–0	Minnesota State; 2–0–0	North Dakota; 1–3–0	Vermont; 2–1–1	Clarkson; 1–1–2	Vermont; 4–2–2	North Dakota; 4–6–0	Michigan; 8–6–0	New Hampshire; 5–6–3	New Hampshire; 7–6–3	Nebraska-Omaha; 11–4–3	Ohio State; 13–6–1	Air Force; 15–4–1	North Dakota; 14–10–2	Minnesota-Duluth; 13–7–6	Ohio State; 17–8–3	Boston College; 12–9–4	Ohio State; 18–10–4	Ohio State; 19–11–4	Colorado College; 16–10–9	St. Lawrence; 19–11–4	Boston College; 18–13–5	Air Force; 27–10–2	Princeton; 22–12–1	Princeton; 22–12–1	15
	Preseason Sep 22	Week 1 Oct 6	Week 2 Oct 13	Week 3 Oct 20	Week 4 Oct 27	Week 5 Nov 3	Week 6 Nov 10	Week 7 Nov 17	Week 8 Nov 24	Week 9 Dec 1	Week 10 Dec 8	Week 11 Dec 15	Week 12 Jan 5	Week 13 Jan 12	Week 14 Jan 19	Week 15 Jan 26	Week 16 Feb 2	Week 17 Feb 9	Week 18 Feb 16	Week 19 Feb 23	Week 20 Mar 2	Week 21 Mar 9	Week 22 Mar 16	Week 23 Mar 23	Week 24 Mar 30	Final Apr 13	
		Dropped: Northern Michigan; 0–0–0	Dropped: Wisconsin; 0–2–0	Dropped: Clarkson; 1–1–0; St. Cloud State; 2–2–0	Dropped: North Dakota; 1–3–0	Dropped: Vermont; 3–2–1	Dropped: Clarkson; 2–2–2; Michigan State; 4–4–2	Dropped: Vermont; 5–3–2	Dropped: New Hampshire; 5–5–3; North Dakota; 4–7–1	Dropped: Nebraska-Omaha; 9–4–1	Dropped: None	Dropped: Minnesota State; 8–7–3	Dropped: Nebraska-Omaha; 12–6–3	Dropped: None	Dropped: Air Force; 15–6–1	Dropped: Colorado College; 13–9–6	Dropped: Minnesota-Duluth; 14–8–6	Dropped: Ohio State; 18–9–3	Dropped: Boston College; 13–10–5	Dropped: Minnesota; 13–11–6; Wisconsin; 16–13–3	Dropped: Minnesota-Duluth; 16–10–8	Dropped: None	Dropped: Colorado College; 16–12–10; Ohio State; 23–14–4	Dropped: Boston College; 18–14–5; Minnesota; 17–13–7; St. Lawrence; 21–12–5	Dropped: Massachusetts-Lowell; 20–16–2	Dropped: None	

== USCHO.com/CBS College Sports ==
	Week 1 Oct 6	Week 2 Oct 14	Week 3 Oct 20	Week 4 Oct 27	Week 5 Nov 3	Week 6 Nov 10	Week 7 Nov 17	Week 8 Nov 24	Week 9 Dec 1	Week 10 Dec 8	Week 11 Dec 15	Week 12 Jan 5	Week 13 Jan 12	Week 14 Jan 19	Week 15 Jan 26	Week 16 Feb 2	Week 17 Feb 9	Week 18 Feb 16	Week 19 Feb 23	Week 20 Mar 2	Week 21 Mar 9	Week 22 Mar 16	Final Mar 23	
1	Boston College (36)	Boston College (45) 1–0–0	Colorado College (39) 4–0–0	Colorado College (37) 4–0–2	Colorado College (41) 5–0–3	Boston University (29) 6–1–0	Minnesota (42) 6–0–4	Minnesota (41) 7–1–4	Notre Dame (40) 10–3–2	Notre Dame (41) 12–3–2	Notre Dame (41) 14–3–2	Notre Dame (47) 16–3–2	Notre Dame (46) 18–3–2	Notre Dame (38) 19–3–3	Notre Dame (37) 19–3–3	Boston University (33) 19–5–1	Boston University (49) 21–5–1	Boston University (44) 23–5–2	Boston University (31) 23–5–4	Boston University (46) 25–5–4	Boston University (42) 27–5–4	Notre Dame (27) 29–5–3	Boston University (27) 31–6–4	1
2	Michigan (5)	Michigan (2) 2–0–0	Denver (5) 3–0–0	Boston College (7) 3–1–0	Boston College (5) 5–1–0	Minnesota (12) 5–0–3	Boston University (4) 7–2–0	Notre Dame (2) 9–3–1	Boston College (1) 9–4–1	Minnesota (3) 7–2–5	Miami (OH) (6) 12–3–3	Boston University (2) 13–4–1	Boston University (2) 14–4–1	Boston University (7) 16–5–1	Boston University (13) 18–5–1	Notre Dame (17) 20–4–3	Notre Dame (1) 21–5–3	Notre Dame (6) 23–5–3	Notre Dame (19) 25–5–3	Notre Dame (4) 27–5–3	Notre Dame (8) 27–5–3	Boston University (23) 29–6–4	Notre Dame (23) 31–5–3	2
3	Colorado College (7)	Colorado College (3) 2–0–0	Boston College (3) 2–1–0	Boston University (1) 4–1–0	Boston University (4) 5–1–0	Colorado College (8) 6–1–3	Colorado College (2) 7–2–3	Colorado College (1) 8–3–3	Minnesota (2) 7–2–5	Miami (OH) (3) 10–3–3	Boston University; 11–4–1	Minnesota; 10–3–5	Northeastern; 14–4–2	Cornell (5) 13–1–3	Northeastern; 17–5–2	Northeastern; 17–6–2	Northeastern; 19–6–2	Michigan; 23–9–0	Michigan; 24–10–0	Michigan; 26–10–0	Michigan; 26–10–0	Michigan; 28–10–0	Michigan; 29–11–0	3
4	Notre Dame (1)	Denver; 1–0–0	New Hampshire (2) 3–0–0	Denver (3) 4–1–0	Minnesota; 4–0–2	Denver (1) 6–2–1	Boston College; 6–3–1	Northeastern; 9–2–2	Miami (OH) (2) 8–3–3	Boston University; 10–4–1	Minnesota (1) 8–3–5	Northeastern; 12–4–2	Denver; 15–6–2	Denver; 15–6–2	Cornell; 14–2–3	Michigan; 19–9–0	Michigan; 21–9–0	Northeastern; 20–8–2	Northeastern; 20–8–4	Northeastern; 22–8–4	Northeastern; 23–9–4	Denver; 22–10–5	Denver; 23–11–5	4
5	North Dakota (1)	Boston University; 2–0–0	Michigan (1) 3–1–0	Minnesota (2) 3–0–1	New Hampshire; 4–1–2	Boston College; 5–3–0	Notre Dame; 7–3–1	Boston College; 7–4–1	Colorado College; 9–4–3	Northeastern; 11–3–2	Denver; 13–5–1	Denver; 13–6–2	Cornell (2) 11–1–3	Northeastern; 15–5–2	Minnesota; 12–5–5	Cornell; 14–3–4	Vermont; 16–6–4	Miami (OH); 18–8–4	Denver; 19–9–4	Denver; 20–10–4	Denver; 20–10–5	Northeastern; 25–10–4	Yale; 24–7–2	5
6	Denver	New Hampshire; 1–0–0	Boston University; 3–1–0	New Hampshire; 3–1–1	Denver; 4–2–1	New Hampshire; 4–2–3	Northeastern; 7–2–2	Miami (OH) (1) 8–3–3	Northeastern; 10–3–2	Denver (1) 11–5–1	Northeastern; 11–3–2	Miami (OH); 12–5–3	Michigan; 15–7–0	Minnesota; 12–5–5	Vermont; 14–5–4	Denver; 16–8–3	Cornell; 15–4–4	Vermont; 17–7–4	Princeton; 20–7–0	North Dakota; 21–11–4	North Dakota; 22–12–4	North Dakota; 24–12–4	Northeastern; 25–11–4	6
7	New Hampshire	Miami (OH); 1–0–1	Minnesota; 2–0–0	Miami (OH); 3–1–2	Michigan; 6–2–0	Northeastern; 6–1–2	Miami (OH); 6–3–3	Princeton (3) 7–1–0	Boston University (1) 9–4–0	Boston College; 9–5–2	Boston College; 9–5–2	Princeton; 13–3–0	Minnesota; 10–5–5	Vermont; 13–5–3	Denver; 15–7–3	Vermont; 14–6–4	Miami (OH); 16–8–4	Yale; 19–5–1	Miami (OH); 18–9–5	Vermont; 19–8–5	Vermont; 20–9–5	Yale; 22–7–2	North Dakota; 24–14–4	7
8	Miami (OH)	Notre Dame; 0–1–0	Notre Dame; 2–1–0	Michigan; 4–2–0	Miami (OH); 4–2–2	Michigan; 7–3–0	Princeton (1) 5–1–0	Boston University (1) 7–4–0	Denver (1) 9–5–1	Princeton (2) 10–2–0	Princeton (2) 10–2–0	Cornell (1) 9–1–3	Vermont; 12–4–3	Michigan; 16–8–0	Michigan; 18–8–0	Miami (OH); 16–8–4	Denver; 17–9–3	Denver; 17–9–4	North Dakota; 20–11–3	Miami (OH); 19–10–5	Miami (OH); 19–10–5	Princeton; 22–10–0	Minnesota-Duluth; 21–12–8	8
9	Boston University	Minnesota; 0–0–0	Princeton; 0–0–0	Northeastern; 5–0–1	Princeton; 1–0–0	Notre Dame; 6–3–0	Michigan; 8–4–0	Denver; 7–5–1	Princeton (2) 9–2–0	Colorado College; 9–5–4	Colorado College; 10–6–4	Boston College; 9–5–2	Miami (OH); 12–7–3	Princeton; 13–5–0	Princeton; 13–5–0	Minnesota; 12–7–5	Princeton; 17–6–0	North Dakota; 18–11–3	Vermont; 17–8–5	New Hampshire; 18–9–5	New Hampshire; 19–10–5	Cornell; 20–8–4	Cornell; 21–9–4	9
10	Minnesota	Princeton; 0–0–0	Miami (OH); 1–1–2	Princeton; 0–0–0	Northeastern; 5–1–2	Miami (OH); 4–3–3	Denver; 6–4–1	Minnesota State; 7–3–2	Air Force (1) 13–1–0	Cornell; 7–1–2	Cornell; 7–1–2	Colorado College†; 11–6–5	Princeton; 13–5–0	Miami (OH); 13–8–3	Miami (OH); 14–8–4	Princeton; 15–6–0	Yale; 17–5–1	Princeton; 18–7–0	Cornell; 17–6–4	Princeton; 20–9–0	Yale; 20–7–2	Vermont; 20–11–5	Princeton; 22–11–1	10
11	Michigan State	Michigan State; 1–1–0	Vermont; 2–0–1	Michigan State; 3–2–1	Michigan State; 4–2–2	Minnesota State; 4–2–2	Minnesota State; 5–3–2	Air Force (1) 12–0–0	Minnesota State; 8–3–3	Vermont; 9–3–2	Air Force; 14–2–0	Michigan†; 13–7–0	Colorado College; 12–7–5	New Hampshire; 11–6–4	Boston College; 11–8–3	New Hampshire; 12–8–4	North Dakota; 16–11–3	Cornell; 15–6–4	Yale; 19–6–2	Yale; 20–7–2	Princeton; 20–9–0	New Hampshire; 19–12–5	Vermont; 20–11–5	11
12	Princeton	St. Cloud State; 2–0–0	Michigan State; 2–2–0	Minnesota State; 3–1–0	Notre Dame; 4–3–0	Princeton; 2–1–0	Air Force (1) 10–0–0	Cornell; 4–0–2	Vermont; 9–3–2	Air Force; 14–2–0	Michigan; 11–7–0	Vermont; 11–4–2	Boston College; 9–6–3	Ohio State; 16–6–2	North Dakota; 15–10–3	Boston College; 11–8–4	New Hampshire; 13–9–4	New Hampshire; 14–9–5	New Hampshire; 16–9–5	Cornell; 18–7–4	Cornell; 18–7–4	Miami (OH); 20–12–5	New Hampshire; 19–12–5	12
13	Clarkson	North Dakota; 0–2–0	Minnesota State; 3–1–0	Notre Dame; 2–3–0	Minnesota State; 3–2–1	Air Force; 8–0–0	New Hampshire; 4–4–3	Vermont; 7–3–2	Cornell; 5–1–2	Michigan; 11–7–0	Vermont; 9–4–2	New Hampshire; 9–6–3	New Hampshire; 10–6–4	Colorado College; 13–8–5	New Hampshire; 11–8–4	North Dakota; 16–11–3	Wisconsin; 16–11–3	Wisconsin; 16–11–3	Colorado College; 16–9–8	Colorado College; 16–10–9	Colorado College; 16–10–10	Minnesota; 17–12–7	Miami (OH); 20–12–5	13
14	Wisconsin	Clarkson; 0–0–0	Northeastern; 3–0–1	Vermont; 2–1–1	Air Force; 8–0–0	Cornell; 1–0–1	Cornell; 2–0–2	Michigan; 8–6–0	Michigan; 9–7–0	Minnesota State; 8–5–3	Wisconsin; 9–7–2	Air Force; 15–4–0	Ohio State; 15–6–1	Boston College; 9–8–3	Ohio State; 16–7–3	Yale; 15–5–1	Minnesota; 12–9–5	Minnesota; 13–9–6	Minnesota-Duluth; 16–9–7	Ohio State; 20–12–4	Ohio State; 22–12–4	St. Lawrence; 21–11–4	Ohio State; 23–14–4	14
15	St. Cloud State	Minnesota State; 2–0–0	St. Cloud State; 2–2–0	Clarkson; 1–1–2	Clarkson; 1–1–2	Vermont; 4–2–2	Vermont; 5–3–2	New Hampshire; 5–5–3	Alaska-Anchorage; 7–5–2	New Hampshire; 7–6–3	New Hampshire; 8–6–3	Dartmouth; 9–5–0	Air Force; 15–4–1	North Dakota; 14–10–2	Wisconsin; 13–10–3	Ohio State; 17–8–3	Boston College; 12–9–4	Minnesota-Duluth; 15–9–6	Ohio State; 19–11–4	St. Lawrence; 19–11–4	St. Lawrence; 19–11–4	Boston College; 18–13–5	St. Lawrence; 21–12–5	15
16	Northern Michigan	Cornell; 0–0–0	North Dakota; 1–3–0	Cornell; 0–0–0	Vermont; 3–2–1	Clarkson; 2–2–2	Massachusetts; 5–3–1	Nebraska-Omaha; 9–2–1	Dartmouth; 6–4–0	Wisconsin; 9–7–2	Nebraska-Omaha; 11–4–3	Ohio State; 13–6–1	Wisconsin; 12–9–3	Wisconsin; 13–10–3	Minnesota-Duluth; 13–7–6	Wisconsin; 14–11–3	Ohio State; 18–9–3	Ohio State; 18–10–4	Wisconsin; 16–13–3	Minnesota-Duluth; 16–10–8	Minnesota; 15–12–7	Wisconsin; 19–15–4	Massachusetts-Lowell; 20–16–2	16
17	Cornell	Vermont; 1–0–0	Cornell; 0–0–0	Air Force; 6–0–0	Cornell; 0–0–0	Michigan State; 4–4–2	St. Cloud State; 7–4–0	Massachusetts; 6–4–1	Massachusetts-Lowell; 8–5–0	St. Cloud State; 10–6–0	Minnesota State; 8–7–3	Wisconsin; 10–9–3	North Dakota; 13–10–1	Minnesota-Duluth; 11–7–6	Colorado College; 13–9–6	Minnesota-Duluth; 14–8–6	Minnesota-Duluth; 15–9–6	Boston College; 13–10–5	St. Lawrence; 17–11–4	Minnesota; 14–11–7	Wisconsin; 17–15–4	Minnesota-Duluth; 18–12–8	Wisconsin; 20–16–4	17
18	Minnesota State	Harvard; 0–0–0	Northern Michigan; 2–2–0	North Dakota; 1–3–0	Harvard; 1–0–0	North Dakota; 3–5–0	Harvard; 4–2–0	St. Cloud State; 8–5–0	Nebraska-Omaha; 9–4–1	Dartmouth; 6–4–0	Alaska†; 8–4–4	Nebraska-Omaha; 12–6–3	Dartmouth; 10–6–0	Dartmouth; 10–7–0	Yale; 13–5–1	Colorado College; 13–9–6	Colorado College; 14–9–7	Colorado College; 14–9–8	Minnesota; 13–11–6	St. Cloud State; 18–14–2	Boston College; 16–13–5	Ohio State; 23–14–4	Air Force; 27–10–2	18
19	Harvard	Northern Michigan; 1–1–0	Clarkson; 1–1–0	St. Cloud State; 3–3–0	Massachusetts; 4–1–1	St. Lawrence; 4–2–1	Nebraska-Omaha; 7–2–1	Alaska-Anchorage; 7–5–2	New Hampshire; 5–6–3	Nebraska-Omaha; 9–4–3	North Dakota†; 9–8–1	Alaska; 10–6–4	Yale; 11–4–0	Alaska; 11–8–5	Air Force; 17–6–1	Dartmouth; 11–7–3	Dartmouth; 12–8–3	St. Cloud State; 17–13–2	St. Cloud State; 17–13–2	Wisconsin; 16–14–4	Minnesota-Duluth; 16–12–8	Massachusetts-Lowell; 19–15–2	Minnesota; 17–13–7	19
20	Vermont	Wisconsin; 0–2–0	Harvard; 0–0–0	Harvard; 0–0–0	Minnesota-Duluth; 4–1–2	Massachusetts; 4–2–1	North Dakota; 4–6–0	Dartmouth; 5–3–0	Alaska; 8–4–2	Alaska; 8–4–4	Dartmouth; 6–4–0	Minnesota-Duluth; 9–5–6	Nebraska-Omaha; 13–7–3	Air Force; 15–6–1	Dartmouth; 10–7–2	St. Lawrence; 14–10–2	Air Force; 19–7–2	St. Lawrence; 16–11–3	Massachusetts-Lowell; 15–13–2	Boston College; 15–12–5	St. Cloud State; 18–15–3	Colorado College; 16–12–10	Boston College; 18–14–5	20
	Week 1 Oct 6	Week 2 Oct 14	Week 3 Oct 20	Week 4 Oct 27	Week 5 Nov 3	Week 6 Nov 10	Week 7 Nov 17	Week 8 Nov 24	Week 9 Dec 1	Week 10 Dec 8	Week 11 Dec 15	Week 12 Jan 5	Week 13 Jan 12	Week 14 Jan 19	Week 15 Jan 26	Week 16 Feb 2	Week 17 Feb 9	Week 18 Feb 16	Week 19 Feb 23	Week 20 Mar 2	Week 21 Mar 9	Week 22 Mar 16	Final Mar 23	
		Dropped: None	Dropped: Wisconsin; 0–4–0	Dropped: Northern Michigan; 3–3–1	Dropped: North Dakota; 2–4–0; St. Cloud State; 3–4–0	Dropped: Harvard; 2–2–0; Minnesota-Duluth; 4–3–2	Dropped: Clarkson; 2–4–2; Michigan State; 4–6–2; St. Lawrence; 4–4–1	Dropped: Harvard; 4–3–2; North Dakota; 4–7–1	Dropped: Alaska-Anchorage; 7–5–2; St. Cloud State; 8–6–0	Dropped: Massachusetts-Lowell; 8–7–0; Nebraska-Omaha; 7–2–3	Dropped: St. Cloud State; 10–8–0	Dropped: Minnesota State; 9–9–3; North Dakota; 11–10–1	Dropped: Alaska; 10–8–4; Minnesota-Duluth; 9–7–6	Dropped: Nebraska-Omaha; 13–8–4; Yale; 11–5–1	Dropped: Alaska; 11–9–6	Dropped: Air Force; 17–7–2	Dropped: St. Lawrence; 14–11–3	Dropped: Air Force; 20–8–2; Dartmouth; 13–9–3	Dropped: Boston College; 13–12–5	Dropped: Massachusetts-Lowell; 15–15–2	Dropped: None	Dropped: St. Cloud State; 18–17–3	Dropped: Colorado College; 16–12–10	
