= 2006 CHA men's ice hockey tournament =

2006 CHA Men's ice hockey tournament
- Dates: March 11–13, 2006
- Teams: 6
- Finals site: Michigan State Fairgrounds Coliseum; Detroit, Michigan
- Champions: Bemidji State (2nd title)
- Winning coach: Tom Serratore (2nd title)
- MVP: Jean-Guy Gervais (Bemidji State)
- CHA Men's Ice Hockey Tournaments

The 2006 CHA Men's Ice Hockey Tournament was the 7th tournament in conference history and was played between March 11 and March 13, 2006, at the Michigan State Fairgrounds Coliseum in Detroit, Michigan. By winning the tournament, Bemidji State received College Hockey America's automatic bid to the 2006 NCAA Men's Division I Ice Hockey Tournament.

== Format ==
The tournament featured six teams. The top two teams from the regular season received byes to the semifinals where they played the winners from the quarterfinal games. The two semifinal winners met in the championship game on March 13, 2006, with the winner receiving an automatic bid to the 2006 NCAA Men's Division I Ice Hockey Tournament.

=== Conference standings ===
Note: GP = Games played; W = Wins; L = Losses; T = Ties; PTS = Points; GF = Goals For; GA = Goals Against

2005–06 College Hockey America standings
	Conference							Overall					
	GP	W	L	T	PTS	GF	GA	GP	W	L	T	GF	GA
Niagara†	20	13	6	1	27	78	62	36	20	15	1	126	121
Bemidji State*	20	12	7	1	25	72	46	37	20	14	3	125	97
Alabama–Huntsville	20	12	7	1	25	66	57	34	19	13	2	105	103
Robert Morris	20	7	11	2	16	51	66	35	12	20	3	94	119
Air Force	20	8	12	0	16	60	74	32	11	20	1	92	114
Wayne State	20	3	12	5	11	59	81	35	6	23	6	87	140
Championship: Bemidji State † indicates conference regular season champion * indicates conference tournament champion Final rankings: USA Today/USA Hockey Magazine Top 15 Poll

== Bracket ==
Quarterfinal

March 11, 2006

Semifinals

March 12, 2006

Championship

March 13, 2006

1
Niagara
3

4
Robert Morris
4

4
Robert Morris
2

5
Air Force
3

1
Niagara
2

2
Bemidji State
4

2
Bemidji State
4*

3
Alabama-Huntsville
3

3
Alabama-Huntsville
3

6
Wayne State
1

Note: * denotes overtime period(s)

== Tournament awards ==
=== All-Star team ===
- Goaltender: Layne Sedevie (Bemidji State)
- Defensemen: Andrew Lackner (Niagara), Andrew Martens (Bemidji State)
- Forwards: Logan Bittle (Robert Morris), Ted Cook (Niagara), Ryan Miller (Bemidji State)

=== MVP ===
- Jean-Guy Gervais (Bemidji State)
