= 2005–06 Alabama–Huntsville Chargers men's ice hockey season =

American college ice hockey team season

2005–06 Alabama–Huntsville Chargers men's ice hockey
- Conference: College Hockey America
- Record: 19–13–2 (12–7–1 CHA)
- Head coach: Doug Ross (24th season)
- Captain: Jeremy Schreiber
- Alternate captain: Bruce Mulherin, Jeff Winchester
- Home stadium: Von Braun Center

The 2005–06 Alabama–Huntsville Chargers ice hockey team represented the University of Alabama in Huntsville in the 2005–06 NCAA Division I men's ice hockey season. The Chargers were coached by Doug Ross who was in his twenty-fourth season as head coach. The Chargers played their home games in the Von Braun Center and were members of the College Hockey America conference.

== Roster ==
No.	Nat.	Player	Class	Pos	Height	Weight	DoB	Hometown	Previous team
2		Matt Montes	Sophomore	D	6' 1" (1.85 m)	195 lb (88 kg)	1983-07-01	Forest Park, Illinois	Springfield (NAHL)
3		Brett McConnachie	Junior	RW	5' 11" (1.8 m)	185 lb (84 kg)	1985-03-01	Ajax, Ontario	Wexford (OJHL)
4		Jeremy Schreiber (C)	Senior	D	6' 1" (1.85 m)	200 lb (91 kg)	1981-07-04	Medicine Hat, Alberta	Canmore (AJHL)
5		Scott Kalinchuk	Freshman	D	6' 1" (1.85 m)	195 lb (88 kg)	1984-11-23	Sylvan Lake, Alberta	Canmore (AJHL)
6		A.J. Larivee	Junior	D	6' 1" (1.85 m)	205 lb (93 kg)	1983-12-19	Dublin, Ontario	St. Marys (GOJHL)
8		Mike Salekin	Sophomore	D	6' 1" (1.85 m)	185 lb (84 kg)	1985-08-17	Castlegar, British Columbia	Merritt (BCHL)
9		Tyler Hilbert	Sophomore	LW	5' 9" (1.75 m)	185 lb (84 kg)	1984-01-12	Okotoks, Alberta	Olds (AJHL)
10		Dominik Rozman	Junior	LW	5' 11" (1.8 m)	190 lb (86 kg)	1983-03-10	Wallaceburg, Ontario	Sarnia (GOJHL)
11		Christian Beaudry	Freshman	D	6' 1" (1.85 m)	205 lb (93 kg)	1984-08-04	Cortland, New York	Texas (NAHL)
12		Josh Murray	Freshman	RW	5' 11" (1.8 m)	190 lb (86 kg)	1984-11-11	Terrace, British Columbia	Williams Lake (BCHL)
13		Bruce Mulherin (A)	Senior	C	6' 1" (1.85 m)	190 lb (86 kg)	1982-02-03	Red Deer, Alberta	Olds (AJHL)
14		Todd Bentley	Senior	LW	5' 10" (1.78 m)	190 lb (86 kg)	1982-01-07	Livonia, Michigan	Cedar Rapids (USHL)
15		Shaun Arvai	Junior	D	5' 10" (1.78 m)	170 lb (77 kg)	1982-10-06	West Lorne, Ontario	Petrolia (WOHL)
16		Denny Reagan	Sophomore	LW	6' 1" (1.85 m)	200 lb (91 kg)	1983-06-29	St. Louis, Missouri	Texas (NAHL)
18		Steve Canter	Junior	RW	6' 1" (1.85 m)	190 lb (86 kg)	1983-06-29	St. Louis, Missouri	Billings (AWHL)
19		Grant Selinger	Junior	C	5' 11" (1.8 m)	180 lb (82 kg)	1983-03-22	Regina, Saskatchewan	South Surrey (BCHL)
21		Derek Conter	Sophomore	LW	6' 2" (1.88 m)	205 lb (93 kg)	1983-06-10	Toronto, Ontario	Wichita Falls (NAHL)
22		David Nimmo	Junior	C	6' 2" (1.88 m)	220 lb (100 kg)	1982-07-25	St. Albert, Alberta	Melfort (SJHL)
24		Jeff Winchester (A)	Senior	D	6' 3" (1.91 m)	220 lb (100 kg)	1981-11-06	Dalhousie, New Brunswick	Cornwall (CCHL)
25		Chris Martini	Senior	LW	6' 1" (1.85 m)	185 lb (84 kg)	1982-07-11	Calgary, Alberta	Canmore (AJHL)
26		Kevin Galerno	Freshman	LW	5' 7" (1.7 m)	160 lb (73 kg)	1984-01-19	Kitchener, Ontario	Kitchener (MWJBHL)
27		Troy Maney	Junior	D	6' 2" (1.88 m)	200 lb (91 kg)	1982-10-04	Huntsville, Alabama	Capital Centre (NAHL)
29		Scott Munroe	Senior	G	6' 2" (1.88 m)	195 lb (88 kg)	1982-01-20	Moose Jaw, Saskatchewan	Notre Dame (SJHL)
30		Jordan Erickson	Freshman	G	6' 1" (1.85 m)	180 lb (82 kg)	1984-04-18	Port McNeill, British Columbia	Spruce Grove (AJHL)
33		Marc Narduzzi	Sophomore	G	6' 2" (1.88 m)	190 lb (86 kg)	1982-05-25	Vancouver, British Columbia	South Surrey (BCHL)
55		Matt Sweazey	Freshman	C	6' 1" (1.85 m)	195 lb (88 kg)	1984-04-11	Toronto, Ontario	Georgetown (OJHL)

== Season ==
=== Schedule ===
Date	Time	Opponent	Site	Decision	Result	Attendance	Record
Exhibition
October 14	7:05 pm	Windsor*	Von Braun Center • Huntsville, Alabama	Munroe	W 5–0	1,391	
October 15	7:05 pm	Windsor*	Von Braun Center • Huntsville, Alabama	Erickson	W 3–2	1,258	
Regular Season
October 21	6:00 pm	at #5 Maine*	Alfond Arena • Orono, Maine	Munroe	L 1–3	5,641	0–1–0
October 22	6:00 pm	at #5 Maine*	Alfond Arena • Orono, Maine	Munroe	L 0–4	5,641	0–2–0
November 4	6:00 pm	at RIT*	Frank Ritter Memorial Ice Arena • Rochester, New York	Munroe	W 3–2	1,423	1–2–0
November 5	6:00 pm	at RIT*	Frank Ritter Memorial Ice Arena • Rochester, New York	Narduzzi	W 4–1	1,753	2–2–0
November 11	7:05 pm	Niagara	Von Braun Center • Huntsville, Alabama	Munroe	W 5–4	1,819	3–2–0 (1–0–0)
November 12	7:05 pm	Niagara	Von Braun Center • Huntsville, Alabama	Erickson	L 4–8	1,928	3–3–0 (1–1–0)
November 18	6:35 pm	at Robert Morris	Island Sports Center • Neville Island, Pennsylvania	Munroe	L 0–1	535	3–4–0 (1–2–0)
November 19	6:35 pm	at Robert Morris	Island Sports Center • Neville Island, Pennsylvania	Munroe	W 6–5	521	4–4–0 (2–2–0)
December 2	6:05 pm	at Ohio State*	Value City Arena • Columbus, Ohio	Munroe	W 4–3	4,405	5–4–0 (2–2–0)
December 3	6:05 pm	at Ohio State*	Value City Arena • Columbus, Ohio	Munroe	T 2–2 ^{OT}	3,651	5–4–1 (2–2–0)
December 9	6:00 pm	at Princeton*	Hobey Baker Rink • Princeton, New Jersey	Munroe	W 4–2	1,263	6–4–1 (2–2–0)
December 10	6:00 pm	at Princeton*	Hobey Baker Rink • Princeton, New Jersey	Erickson	L 0–4	1,224	6–5–1 (2–2–0)
December 29	7:05 pm	at Nebraska–Omaha*	CenturyLink Center Omaha • Omaha, Nebraska	Munroe	L 5–8	4,414	6–6–1 (2–2–0)
December 31	7:05 pm	at Minnesota State*	Alltel Center • Mankato, Minnesota	Munroe	L 2–6	2,929	6–7–1 (2–2–0)
January 6	7:05 pm	Air Force	Von Braun Center • Huntsville, Alabama	Munroe	W 3–2	2,757	7–7–1 (3–2–0)
January 7	4:05 pm	Air Force	Von Braun Center • Huntsville, Alabama	Munroe	W 6–3	1,513	8–7–1 (4–2–0)
January 13	7:05 pm	Robert Morris	Von Braun Center • Huntsville, Alabama	Munroe	W 3–1	1,712	9–7–1 (5–2–0)
January 14	4:05 pm	Robert Morris	Von Braun Center • Huntsville, Alabama	Munroe	W 8–1	2,209	10–7–1 (6–2–0)
January 20	6:05 pm	at Niagara	Dwyer Arena • Lewiston, New York	Munroe	W 4–3	1,114	11–7–1 (7–2–0)
January 21	1:05 pm	at Niagara	Dwyer Arena • Lewiston, New York	Munroe	L 3–4	1,090	11–8–1 (7–3–0)
January 27	6:05 pm	at Wayne State	Michigan State Fairgrounds Coliseum • Detroit, Michigan	Munroe	T 2–2 ^{OT}	389	11–8–2 (7–3–1)
January 28	6:05 pm	at Wayne State	Michigan State Fairgrounds Coliseum • Detroit, Michigan	Munroe	W 6–2	468	12–8–2 (8–3–1)
February 3	7:05 pm	Bemidji State	Von Braun Center • Huntsville, Alabama	Munroe	W 2–1	2,123	13–8–2 (9–3–1)
February 4	4:05 pm	Bemidji State	Von Braun Center • Huntsville, Alabama	Munroe	W 4–2	1,623	14–8–2 (10–3–1)
February 10	7:05 pm	RIT*	Von Braun Center • Huntsville, Alabama	Munroe	W 4–3	1,448	15–8–2 (10–3–1)
February 11	7:05 pm	RIT*	Von Braun Center • Huntsville, Alabama	Narduzzi	W 4–3	2,463	16–8–2 (10–3–1)
February 17	8:05 pm	at Air Force	Cadet Ice Arena • Colorado Springs, Colorado	Munroe	L 1–3	1,017	16–9–2 (10–4–1)
February 18	8:05 pm	at Air Force	Cadet Ice Arena • Colorado Springs, Colorado	Munroe	L 0–5	1,715	16–10–2 (10–5–1)
February 24	7:05 pm	Wayne State	Von Braun Center • Huntsville, Alabama	Munroe	W 2–1	1,854	17–10–2 (11–5–1)
February 25	4:05 pm	Wayne State	Von Braun Center • Huntsville, Alabama	Munroe	W 6–1	1,819	18–10–2 (12–5–1)
March 3	7:35 pm	at Bemidji State	John S. Glas Field House • Bemidji, Minnesota	Munroe	L 1–3	1,615	18–11–2 (12–6–1)
March 4	7:05 pm	at Bemidji State	John S. Glas Field House • Bemidji, Minnesota	Munroe	L 0–5	1,630	18–12–2 (12–7–1)
CHA Tournament
March 10	6:35 pm	at Wayne State*	Michigan State Fairgrounds Coliseum • Detroit, Michigan (CHA Tournament Quarterfinal)	Munroe	W 3–1	1,109	19–12–2 (12–7–1)
March 11	6:35 pm	vs. Bemidji State*	Michigan State Fairgrounds Coliseum • Detroit, Michigan (CHA Tournament Semifinal)	Munroe	L 3–4 ^{OT}	1,008	19–13–2 (12–7–1)
*Non-conference game. All times are in Central Time.

=== Standings ===
2005–06 College Hockey America standings
	Conference							Overall					
	GP	W	L	T	PTS	GF	GA	GP	W	L	T	GF	GA
Niagara†	20	13	6	1	27	78	62	36	20	15	1	126	121
Bemidji State*	20	12	7	1	25	72	46	37	20	14	3	125	97
Alabama–Huntsville	20	12	7	1	25	66	57	34	19	13	2	105	103
Robert Morris	20	7	11	2	16	51	66	35	12	20	3	94	119
Air Force	20	8	12	0	16	60	74	32	11	20	1	92	114
Wayne State	20	3	12	5	11	59	81	35	6	23	6	87	140
Championship: Bemidji State † indicates conference regular season champion * indicates conference tournament champion Final rankings: USA Today/USA Hockey Magazine Top 15 Poll

=== Statistics ===
==== Skaters ====
Player	Pos	Yr	GP	G	A	Pts	PIM	PPG	SHG	GWG
Bruce Mulherin	C	Sr	33	16	19	35	47	5	2	1
David Nimmo	C	Jr	31	9	12	21	34	3	0	2
Jeremy Schreiber	D	Sr	34	4	17	21	26	4	0	0
Brett McConnachie	RW	Jr	34	10	10	20	65	5	0	3
Shaun Arvai	D	Jr	34	2	18	20	34	1	0	0
Chris Martini	LW	Sr	34	5	14	19	51	2	0	3
Steve Canter	RW	Jr	34	9	8	17	32	3	1	4
Mike Salekin	D	So	34	8	8	16	80	6	0	0
Grant Selinger	C	Jr	33	8	7	15	48	1	2	1
Dominik Rozman	LW	Jr	33	4	11	15	32	0	0	0
Todd Bentley	LW	Sr	25	8	6	14	51	0	1	2
Jeff Winchester	D	Sr	34	0	13	13	58	0	0	0
Tyler Hilbert	LW	So	33	5	7	12	26	0	0	1
Matt Sweazey	C	Fr	34	5	7	12	40	2	0	1
Kevin Galerno	LW	Fr	31	3	7	10	16	0	0	0
Josh Murray	RW	Fr	33	4	3	7	31	0	0	1
A.J. Larivee	D	Jr	22	1	4	5	25	0	0	0
Scott Kalinchuk	D	Fr	34	1	4	5	26	0	0	0
Derek Conter	LW	So	10	3	1	4	4	0	0	0
Denny Reagan	LW	So	3	0	1	1	2	0	0	0
Matt Montes	D	So	17	0	1	1	34	0	0	0
Scott Munroe	G	Sr	31	0	1	1		0	0	0
Jordan Erickson	G	Fr	2	0	0	0		0	0	0
Troy Maney	D	Jr	2	0	0	0	0	0	0	0
Marc Narduzzi	G	So	5	0	0	0		0	0	0
Team			34	105	179	284	762	32	6	19

==== Goalies ====
Player	Yr	GP	TOI	W	L	T	GA	GAA	SV	SV%	SO
Scott Munroe	Sr	31	1813	17	11	2	91	3.01	993	0.916	0
Marc Narduzzi	So	5	159	2	0	0	6	2.26	63	0.913	0
Jordan Erickson	Fr	2	75	0	2	0	5	4.00	39	0.886	0
