= 2005–06 NCAA Division I men's ice hockey season =

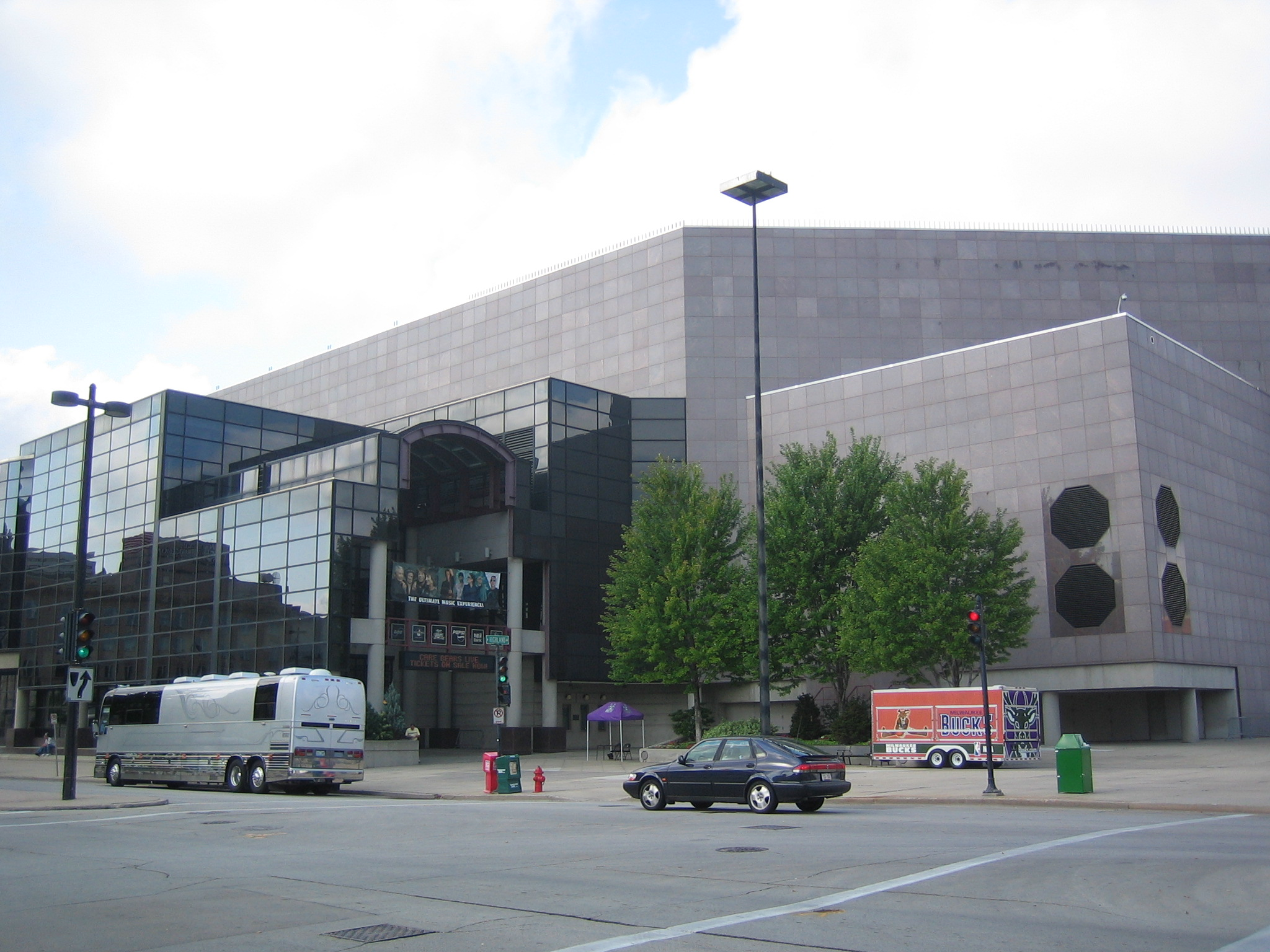
- The Bradley Center in Milwaukee, Wisconsin hosted the 2006 Frozen Four
- Duration: October 7, 2005– April 8, 2006
- NCAA tournament: 2006
- National championship: Bradley Center; Milwaukee, Wisconsin
- NCAA champion: Wisconsin
- Hobey Baker Award: Matt Carle (Denver)

The 2005–06 NCAA Division I men's ice hockey season began on October 7, 2005 and concluded with the 2006 NCAA Division I men's ice hockey tournament's championship game on April 8, 2006 at the Bradley Center in Milwaukee, Wisconsin. This was the 59th season in which an NCAA ice hockey championship was held and is the 112th year overall where an NCAA school fielded a team.

== Season Outlook ==
=== Pre-season polls ===
The top teams in the nation as ranked before the start of the season.

The U.S. College Hockey Online/College Sports Television poll was voted on by coaches, media, and NHL scouts. The USA Today/USA Hockey Magazine poll was voted on by coaches and media.

USCHO / CSTV Poll
Rank	Team
1	Denver (17)
2	Minnesota (13)
3	Boston College (2)
4	Cornell
5	Ohio State (2)
6	Colorado College
7	North Dakota (1)
8	Michigan
9	New Hampshire
10	Wisconsin (1)
11	Maine
12	Northern Michigan
13	Boston University
14	Dartmouth
15	Harvard
16	U. Mass-Lowell
17	Michigan State
18	Colgate
19 (tie)	Minnesota-Duluth
19 (tie)	Vermont

USA Today Poll
Rank	Team
1	Minnesota (17)
2	Denver (13)
3 (tie)	Ohio State (2)
3 (tie)	Cornell
5	Boston College (1)
6	North Dakota
7	Colorado College
8	Michigan
9	New Hampshire
10	Wisconsin
11	Maine
12	Boston University
13	Northern Michigan
14	Dartmouth
15	Harvard

== Regular season ==
=== Season tournaments ===
Tournament	Dates	Teams	Champion
Ice Breaker Tournament	October 7–8	4	Colorado College
Lefty McFadden Invitational	October 8–9	4	Michigan State
Maverick Stampede	October 14–15	4	Nebraska–Omaha
Nye Frontier Classic	October 14–15	4	Vermont
College Hockey Showcase	November 25–26	4	
Rensselaer Holiday Tournament	November 25–26	4	Nebraska–Omaha
Providence Holiday Tournament	December 21–22	4	Providence
Florida College Classic	December 27–28	4	Cornell
Dodge Holiday Classic	December 29–30	4	Minnesota
Great Lakes Invitational	December 29–30	4	Colorado College
Ohio Hockey Classic	December 29–30	4	Miami
UConn Hockey Classic	December 29–30	4	Bowling Green
Badger Showdown	December 30–31	4	Wisconsin
Catamount Cup	December 30–31	4	Vermont
Denver Cup	December 30–31	4	Boston College
Beanpot	February 6, 13	4	Boston University

=== Standings ===
2005–06 Atlantic Hockey standings
	Conference							Overall					
	GP	W	L	T	PTS	GF	GA	GP	W	L	T	GF	GA
#14 Holy Cross†*	28	19	7	2	40	98	65	39	27	10	2	130	95
Mercyhurst	28	19	8	1	39	119	87	36	22	13	1	150	118
Sacred Heart	28	18	8	2	38	92	55	35	21	12	2	116	82
Bentley	28	11	12	5	27	75	82	37	15	17	5	94	117
Army	28	10	12	6	26	64	67	36	12	18	6	80	94
Connecticut	28	9	18	1	19	79	106	36	11	23	2	97	136
Canisius	28	8	18	2	18	68	87	35	10	23	2	87	114
American International	28	6	17	5	17	64	110	32	6	21	5	69	129
Championship: Holy Cross † indicates conference regular season champion * indicates conference tournament champion Final rankings: USA Today/USA Hockey Magazine Top 15 Poll

2005–06 Central Collegiate Hockey Association standings
	Conference							Overall					
	GP	W	L	T	PTS	GF	GA	GP	W	L	T	GF	GA
#9 Miami†	28	20	6	2	42	96	57	39	26	9	4	122	79
#6 Michigan State*	28	14	7	7	35	82	66	45	25	12	8	138	103
#12 Michigan	28	13	10	5	31	102	82	41	21	15	5	147	125
Northern Michigan	28	14	12	2	30	83	79	40	22	16	2	118	104
Nebraska-Omaha	28	12	10	6	30	99	90	41	20	15	6	146	136
Lake Superior State	28	11	12	5	27	75	70	36	15	14	7	93	84
Ferris State	28	10	11	7	27	77	81	40	17	15	8	121	114
Notre Dame	28	11	13	4	26	75	76	36	13	19	4	89	98
Alaska-Fairbanks	28	11	13	4	26	64	79	39	18	16	5	92	105
Ohio State	28	11	14	3	25	72	71	39	15	19	5	97	92
Western Michigan	28	7	16	5	19	69	115	40	10	24	6	97	160
Bowling Green	28	8	18	2	18	83	111	38	13	23	2	124	147
Championship: Michigan State † indicates conference regular season champion * indicates conference tournament champion Final rankings: USA Today/USA Hockey Magazine Top 15 Poll

2005–06 College Hockey America standings
	Conference							Overall					
	GP	W	L	T	PTS	GF	GA	GP	W	L	T	GF	GA
Niagara†	20	13	6	1	27	78	62	36	20	15	1	126	121
Bemidji State*	20	12	7	1	25	72	46	37	20	14	3	125	97
Alabama–Huntsville	20	12	7	1	25	66	57	34	19	13	2	105	103
Robert Morris	20	7	11	2	16	51	66	35	12	20	3	94	119
Air Force	20	8	12	0	16	60	74	32	11	20	1	92	114
Wayne State	20	3	12	5	11	59	81	35	6	23	6	87	140
Championship: Bemidji State † indicates conference regular season champion * indicates conference tournament champion Final rankings: USA Today/USA Hockey Magazine Top 15 Poll

2005–06 Division I ice hockey Independent standings
	Conference							Overall					
	GP	W	L	T	PTS	GF	GA	GP	W	L	T	GF	GA
RIT	0	0	0	0	-	-	-	30	6	22	2	85	110

2005–06 ECAC Hockey standings
	Conference							Overall					
	GP	W	L	T	PTS	GF	GA	GP	W	L	T	GF	GA
Dartmouth†	22	14	6	2	30	84	56	33	19	12	2	113	92
Colgate†	22	14	6	2	30	66	46	39	20	13	6	113	93
#7 Cornell	22	13	6	3	29	61	48	35	22	9	4	99	77
#10 Harvard*	22	13	8	1	27	63	59	35	21	12	2	111	92
St. Lawrence	22	12	9	1	25	74	66	40	21	17	2	130	121
Rensselaer	22	8	8	6	22	53	56	37	14	17	6	105	111
Union	22	9	9	4	22	48	53	38	16	16	6	90	103
Clarkson	22	9	11	2	20	61	70	38	18	17	3	121	111
Princeton	22	7	12	3	17	62	69	31	10	18	3	81	96
Quinnipiac	22	8	13	1	17	70	74	39	20	18	1	130	110
Yale	22	6	14	2	14	65	83	33	10	20	3	89	123
Brown	22	3	14	5	11	45	72	32	5	20	7	69	106
Championship: Harvard † indicates conference regular season champion (Cleary Cup) * indicates conference tournament champion (Whitelaw Cup); Final rankings: USA Today/USA Hockey Magazine Top 15 Poll

2005–06 Hockey East standings
	Conference							Overall					
	GP	W	L	T	PTS	GF	GA	GP	W	L	T	GF	GA
#5 Boston University†*	27	17	7	3	37	89	67	40	26	10	4	140	96
#4 Maine	27	17	8	2	36	93	60	42	28	12	2	143	95
#2 Boston College	27	17	8	2	36	86	58	42	26	13	3	146	95
#13 New Hampshire	27	14	7	6	34	85	63	40	20	13	7	120	102
Providence	27	14	10	3	31	78	67	36	17	16	3	105	94
Vermont	27	10	11	6	26	65	62	38	18	14	6	97	82
Massachusetts–Lowell	27	11	14	2	24	74	96	36	14	20	2	104	132
Massachusetts	27	10	15	2	22	60	77	36	13	21	2	77	103
Northeastern	27	3	17	7	13	57	88	34	3	24	7	67	120
Merrimack	27	3	19	5	11	43	92	34	6	23	5	64	118
Championship: Boston University † indicates conference regular season champion * indicates conference tournament champion Final rankings: USA Today/USA Hockey Magazine Top 15 Poll

2005–06 Western Collegiate Hockey Association standings
	Conference							Overall					
	GP	W	L	T	PTS	GF	GA	GP	W	L	T	GF	GA
#8 Minnesota†	28	20	5	3	43	107	64	41	27	9	5	169	105
Denver	28	17	8	3	37	98	78	39	21	15	3	125	110
#1 Wisconsin	28	17	8	3	37	98	60	43	30	10	3	145	79
#3 North Dakota*	28	16	12	0	32	104	76	46	29	16	1	164	109
#11 Colorado College	28	15	11	2	32	94	75	42	24	16	2	143	109
#15 St. Cloud State	28	13	13	2	28	79	62	42	22	16	4	134	99
Minnesota State-Mankato	28	12	13	3	27	93	88	39	17	18	4	126	121
Michigan Tech	28	6	16	6	18	54	113	38	7	25	6	74	149
Minnesota–Duluth	28	6	19	3	15	61	114	40	11	25	4	97	148
Alaska–Anchorage	28	4	21	3	11	51	110	36	6	27	3	68	138
Championship: North Dakota † indicates conference regular season champion * indicates conference tournament champion Final rankings: USA Today/USA Hockey Magazine Top 15 Poll

=== Final regular season polls ===
The top teams ranked before the NCAA tournament.

USA Today Poll
Ranking	Team
1	Boston University
2	Wisconsin
3	Michigan State
4	Minnesota
5	Miami
6	North Dakota
7	Harvard
8	Boston College
9	Cornell
10	Maine
11	New Hampshire
12	Michigan
13	Colorado College
14	St. Cloud State
15	Denver

USCHO / CSTV Poll
Ranking	Team
1	Boston University
2	Wisconsin
3	Minnesota
4	Michigan State
5	Miami
6	North Dakota
7	Harvard
8	Cornell
9	Boston College
10	Maine
11	Michigan
12	Colorado College
13	New Hampshire
14	St. Cloud State
15	Nebraska Omaha
16	Denver
17	Dartmouth
18	Northern Michigan
19	Holy Cross
20	Colgate

== 2006 NCAA tournament ==
Regional semifinals
1	Michigan State	1
4	New Hampshire	0
East Regional
2	Harvard	1
3	Maine	6
1	Wisconsin	4
4	Bemidji State	0
Midwest Regional
2	Cornell	3
3	Colorado College	2
1	Boston University	9
4	Nebraska-Omaha	2
Northeast Regional
2	Miami	0
3	Boston College	5
1	Minnesota	3
4	Holy Cross	4
West Regional
2	North Dakota	5
3	Michigan	1

Regional Finals
1	Michigan State	4
3	Maine	5
1	Wisconsin	1
2	Cornell	0
1	Boston University	0
3	Boston College	5
4	Holy Cross	2
2	North Dakota	5

Frozen Four
E3	Maine	2
MW1	Wisconsin	5
NE3	Boston College	6
W2	North Dakota	5

National championship
MW1	Wisconsin	2
NE3	Boston College	1

== Player stats ==
=== Scoring leaders ===
The following players led the league in points at the conclusion of the season.

GP = Games played; G = Goals; A = Assists; Pts = Points; PIM = Penalty minutes

Player	Class	Team	GP	G	A	Pts	PIM
Ryan Potulny	Junior	Minnesota	41	38	25	63	38
Chris Collins	Senior	Boston College	42	34	29	63	24
Scott Parse	Junior	Nebraska-Omaha	41	20	41	61	16
Joe Pavelski	Sophomore	Wisconsin	43	23	33	56	34
Brett Sterling	Senior	Colorado College	41	31	24	55	104
Tyler McGregor	Senior	Holy Cross	38	26	28	54	36
Matt Carle	Junior	Denver	39	11	42	53	30
Paul Stastny	Sophomore	Denver	39	19	34	53	12
T. J. Hensick	Junior	Michigan	41	17	35	52	24
Brian Boyle	Junior	Boston College	42	22	30	52	56

=== Leading goaltenders ===
The following goaltenders led the league in goals against average at the end of the regular season while playing at least 33% of their team's total minutes.

GP = Games played; Min = Minutes played; W = Wins; L = Losses; OT = Overtime/shootout losses; GA = Goals against; SO = Shutouts; SV% = Save percentage; GAA = Goals against average

Player	Class	Team	GP	Min	W	L	OT	GA	SO	SV%	GAA
Brian Elliott	Junior	Wisconsin	35	2128	27	5	3	55	8	.938	1.55
Charlie Effinger	Sophomore	Miami	19	1145	12	4	3	35	1	.931	1.83
Jeff Lerg	Freshman	Michigan State	31	1840	17	6	6	60	3	.928	1.96
Joe Fallon	Sophomore	Vermont	33	1931	14	14	5	65	6	.907	2.02
Jeff Zatkoff	Freshman	Miami	20	1217	14	5	1	41	3	.928	2.02
David McKee	Junior	Cornell	35	2139	22	9	4	74	3	.910	2.08
Cory Schneider	Sophomore	Boston College	39	2361	24	13	2	83	8	.929	2.11
Dave Caruso	Senior	Ohio State	36	2146	13	18	5	77	5	.915	2.15
Bobby Goepfert	Junior	St. Cloud State	38	2264	20	14	4	83	3	.924	2.20
Jordan Parise	Junior	North Dakota	34	2017	24	9	1	74	6	.929	2.20

== Awards ==
=== NCAA ===
Award		Recipient
Hobey Baker Memorial Award		Matt Carle, Denver
Spencer T. Penrose Award (Coach of the Year)		Enrico Blasi, Miami
Most Outstanding Player in NCAA Tournament		Robbie Earl, Wisconsin
AHCA All-American Teams
East First Team	Position	West First Team
Cory Schneider, Boston College	G	Brian Elliott, Wisconsin
Peter Harrold, Boston College	D	Matt Carle, Denver
Dan Spang, Boston University	D	Andy Greene, Miami
Chris Collins, Boston College	F	Scott Parse, Nebraska-Omaha
Greg Moore, Maine	F	Ryan Potulny, Minnesota
T. J. Trevelyan, St. Lawrence	F	Brett Sterling, Colorado College
East Second Team	Position	West Second Team
John Curry, Boston University	G	Bobby Goepfert, St. Cloud State
Reid Cashman, Quinnipiac	D	Tom Gilbert, Wisconsin
Brian Yandle, New Hampshire	D	Nathan Oystrick, Northern Michigan
Brian Boyle, Boston College	F	David Backes, Minnesota State-Mankato
Michel Léveillé, Maine	F	Joe Pavelski, Wisconsin
Mike Ouellette, Dartmouth	F	Paul Stastny, Denver

=== Atlantic Hockey ===
Award		Recipient
Player of the Year		Tyler McGregor, Holy Cross
Best Defensive Forward		Blair Bartlett, Holy Cross
Best Defenseman		Rob Godfrey, Holy Cross
Rookie of the Year		Bear Trapp, Sacred Heart
Regular Season Goaltending Award		Tony Quesada, Holy Cross
Coach of the Year		Brian Riley, Army
Most Valuable Player in Tournament		James Sixsmith, Holy Cross
Individual Sportsmanship		Tyler McGregor, Holy Cross
Regular Season Scoring Trophy		Tyler McGregor, Holy Cross
		Ben Cottreau, Mercyhurst
All-Atlantic Hockey Teams
First Team	Position	Second Team
Jason Smith, Sacred Heart	G	Brad Roberts, Army
	G	Tony Quesada, Holy Cross
Jamie Hunt, Mercyhurst	D	Josh Chase, Bentley
Jon Landry, Holy Cross	D	Tim Manthey, Army
Tyler McGregor, Holy Cross	F	Pierre Napert-Frenette, Holy Cross
Dave Borrelli, Mercyhurst	F	Ben Cottreau, Mercyhurst
Pierre-Luc O'Brien, Sacred Heart	F	Alexandre Parent, Sacred Heart
Rookie Team	Position	
Dan Griffin, Canisius	G	
Sean Erickson, Connecticut	D	
Tim Manthey, Army	D	
Bear Trapp, Sacred Heart	F	
Anthony Canzoneri, Bentley	F	
Jeff Gumear, Bentley	F	
Chris Trafford, Mercyhurst	F	

=== CCHA ===
Awards		Recipient
Player of the Year		Scott Parse, Nebraska-Omaha
Best Defensive Forward		Drew Miller, Michigan State
Best Defensive Defenseman		Andy Greene, Miami
Best Offensive Defenseman		Andy Greene, Miami
Rookie of the Year		Jeff Lerg, Michigan State
Best Goaltender		Charlie Effinger, Miami
Coach of the Year		Enrico Blasi, Miami
Terry Flanagan Memorial Award		Steve McJannet, Lake Superior State
Ilitch Humanitarian Award		Drew Miller, Michigan State
Perani Cup Champion		Jeff Jakaitis, Lake Superior State
Scholar-Athlete of the Year		Michael Eickman, Nebraska-Omaha
Most Valuable Player in Tournament		Jeff Lerg, Michigan State
All-CCHA Teams
First Team	Position	Second Team
Jeff Jakaitis, Lake Superior State	G	Charlie Effinger, Miami
Andy Greene, Miami	D	Mitch Ganzek, Miami
Nathan Oystrick, Northern Michigan	D	Matt Hunwick, Michigan
Scott Parse, Nebraska-Omaha	F	T. J. Hensick, Michigan
Nathan Davis, Miami	F	Alex Foster, Bowling Green
Bill Thomas, Nebraska-Omaha	F	Ryan Jones, Miami
Rookie Team	Position	
Jeff Lerg, Michigan State	G	
Tyler Eckford, Alaska-Fairbanks	D	
Jack Johnson, Michigan	D	
Andrew Cogliano, Michigan	F	
Erik Condra, Notre Dame	F	
Dan Riedel, Ferris State	F	

=== CHA ===
Award		Recipient
Player of the Year		Scott Munroe, Alabama-Huntsville
		Jeff Van Nyatten, Niagara
Rookie of the Year		Ted Cook, Niagara
		Les Reaney, Niagara
Coach of the Year		Dave Burkholder, Niagara
Student-Athlete of the Year		Brooks Turnquist, Air Force
Easton Three-Star Player of the Year		Bruce Mulherin, Alabama-Huntsville
Most Valuable Player in Tournament		Jean-Guy Gervais, Bemidji State
All-CHA Teams
First Team	Position	Second Team
Scott Munroe, Alabama-Huntsville	G	Jeff Van Nyatten, Niagara
Andrew Martens, Bemidji State	D	Steve Kovalchik, Wayne State
Jeremy Schreiber, Alabama-Huntsville	D	Michael Mayra, Air Force
Sean Bentivoglio, Niagara	F	Ted Cook, Niagara
Luke Erickson, Bemidji State	F	Eric Ehn, Air Force
Bruce Mulherin, Alabama-Huntsville	F	Les Reaney, Niagara
Rookie Team	Position	
Cody Bostock, Bemidji State	D	
Michael Mayra, Air Force	D	
Ted Cook, Niagara	F	
Chris Margott, Robert Morris	F	
Les Reaney, Niagara	F	
Tyler Scofield, Bemidji State	F	

=== ECAC ===
Award		Recipient
Player of the Year		T. J. Trevelyan, St. Lawrence
Rookie of the Year		Bryan Leitch, Quinnipiac
Coach of the Year		Bob Gaudet, Dartmouth
Best Defensive Forward		Mike Ouellette, Dartmouth
Best Defensive Defenseman		Mike Madill, St. Lawrence
Ken Dryden Award		Mark Dekanich, Colgate
Most Outstanding Player in Tournament		John Daigneau, Harvard
All-ECAC Hockey Teams
First Team	Position	Second Team
Mark Dekanich, Colgate	G	Kris Mayotte, Union
Reid Cashman, Quinnipiac	D	Grant Lewis, Dartmouth
Mike Madill, St. Lawrence	D	Dylan Reese, Harvard
T. J. Trevelyan, St. Lawrence	F	Kyle Wilson, Colgate
Tyler Burton, Colgate	F	David Jones, Dartmouth
Mike Ouellette, Dartmouth	F	Matt Moulson, Cornell
Third Team	Position	Rookie Team
Eric Leroux, Princeton	G	Mathias Lange, Rensselaer
Ryan O'Byrne, Cornell	D	Matt Generous, St. Lawrence
Keith McWilliams, Rensselaer	D	Nick St. Pierre, Colgate
Nick Dodge, Clarkson	F	Bryan Leitch, Quinnipiac
Grant Goeckner-Zoeller, Princeton	F	Shea Guthrie, Clarkson
Kevin Croxton, Rensselaer	F	Brett Wilson, Princeton
Kevin Du, Harvard	F	

=== Hockey East ===
Award		Recipient
Player of the Year		Chris Collins, Boston College
Rookie of the Year		Brandon Yip, Boston University
Bob Kullen Coach of the Year Award		Jack Parker, Boston University
Len Ceglarski Sportsmanship Award		Danny O'Brien, Massachusetts-Lowell
Best Defensive Forward		Brad Zancanaro, Boston University
Best Defensive Defenseman		Peter Harrold, Boston College
Three-Stars Award		Chris Collins, Boston College
		Cory Schneider, Boston College
William Flynn Tournament Most Valuable Player		David Van der Gulik, Boston University
All-Hockey East Teams
First Team	Position	Second Team
John Curry, Boston University	G	Cory Schneider, Boston College
Peter Harrold, Boston College	D	Marvin Degon, Massachusetts
Dan Spang, Boston University	D	Brian Yandle, New Hampshire
Brian Boyle, Boston College	F	Michel Léveillé, Maine
Chris Collins, Boston College	F	Peter MacArthur, Boston University
Greg Moore, Maine	F	Daniel Winnik, New Hampshire
Rookie Team	Position	
Ben Bishop, Maine	G	
Brett Motherwell, Boston College	D	
Cody Wild, Providence	D	
Benn Ferriero, Boston College	F	
Rob Ricci, Merrimack	F	
Brandon Yip, Boston University	F	

=== WCHA ===
Award		Recipient
Player of the Year		Matt Carle, Denver
Defensive Player of the Year		Matt Carle, Denver
Rookie of the Year		Phil Kessel, Minnesota
Student-Athlete of the Year		Ted O'Leary, Denver
Coach of the Year		Don Lucia, Minnesota
		Bob Motzko, St. Cloud State
Most Valuable Player in Tournament		Jordan Parise, North Dakota
All-WCHA Teams
First Team	Position	Second Team
Bobby Goepfert, St. Cloud State	G	Brian Elliott, Wisconsin
Matt Carle, Denver	D	Alex Goligoski, Minnesota
Tom Gilbert, Wisconsin	D	Brian Salcido, Colorado College
Ryan Potulny, Minnesota	F	Joe Pavelski, Wisconsin
Brett Sterling, Colorado College	F	Marty Sertich, Colorado College
Paul Stastny, Denver	F	David Backes, Minnesota State-Mankato
Third Team	Position	Rookie Team
Jordan Parise, North Dakota	G	Dan Tormey, Minnesota State-Mankato
Chris Harrington, Minnesota	D	Chris Butler, Denver
Matt Smaby, North Dakota	D	Brian Lee, North Dakota
Drew Stafford, North Dakota	F	Phil Kessel, Minnesota
Ryan Dingle, Denver	F	T. J. Oshie, North Dakota
Danny Irmen, Minnesota	F	Mason Raymond, Minnesota-Duluth

== 2006 NHL entry draft ==
Round	Pick	Player	College	Conference	NHL team
1	1	Erik Johnson ^{†}	Minnesota	WCHA	St. Louis Blues
1	3	Jonathan Toews	North Dakota	WCHA	Chicago Blackhawks
1	5	Phil Kessel	Minnesota	WCHA	Boston Bruins
1	7	Kyle Okposo ^{†}	Minnesota	WCHA	New York Islanders
1	19	Mark Mitera	Michigan	CCHA	Mighty Ducks of Anaheim
1	20	David Fischer ^{†}	Minnesota	WCHA	Montreal Canadiens
1	29	Chris Summers ^{†}	Michigan	CCHA	Phoenix Coyotes
2	32	Carl Sneep ^{†}	Boston College	Hockey East	Pittsburgh Penguins
2	39	Andreas Nödl ^{†}	St. Cloud State	WCHA	Philadelphia Flyers
2	42	Mike Ratchuk ^{†}	Michigan State	CCHA	Philadelphia Flyers
2	45	Jeff Petry ^{†}	Michigan State	CCHA	Edmonton Oilers
2	51	Nigel Williams ^{†}	Wisconsin	WCHA	Colorado Avalanche
2	52	Keith Seabrook ^{†}	Denver	WCHA	Washington Capitals
2	56	Blake Geoffrion ^{†}	Wisconsin	WCHA	Nashville Predators
2	61	Simon Danis-Pepin	Maine	Hockey East	Chicago Blackhawks
2	63	Jamie McBain ^{†}	Wisconsin	WCHA	Carolina Hurricanes
3	65	Brian Strait ^{†}	Boston University	Hockey East	Pittsburgh Penguins
3	68	Eric Gryba ^{†}	Boston University	Hockey East	Ottawa Senators
3	74	Jeff Zatkoff	Miami	CCHA	Los Angeles Kings
3	79	Jon Matsumoto	Bowling Green	CCHA	Philadelphia Flyers
3	80	Michael Forney ^{†}	North Dakota	WCHA	Atlanta Thrashers
3	81	Mike Carman ^{†}	Minnesota	WCHA	Colorado Avalanche
3	89	Aaron Marvin ^{†}	St. Cloud State	WCHA	Calgary Flames
4	94	Ryan Turek ^{†}	Michigan State	CCHA	St. Louis Blues
4	96	Joe Palmer ^{†}	Ohio State	CCHA	Chicago Blackhawks
4	100	Rhett Rakhshani ^{†}	Denver	WCHA	New York Islanders
4	102	Kyle Medvec ^{†}	Vermont	Hockey East	Minnesota Wild
4	107	Tyler Miller ^{†}	Northern Michigan	WCHA	New Jersey Devils
4	108	Jase Weslosky ^{†}	St. Cloud State	WCHA	New York Islanders
4	110	Kevin Montgomery ^{†}	Ohio State	CCHA	Colorado Avalanche
4	116	Derrick LaPoint ^{†}	North Dakota	WCHA	Florida Panthers
4	119	Doug Rogers ^{†}	Harvard	ECAC Hockey	New York Islanders
4	120	Richard Bachman ^{†}	Colorado College	WCHA	Dallas Stars
5	124	Andrew Sackrison ^{†}	Minnesota State	WCHA	St. Louis Blues
5	125	Chad Johnson	Alaska–Fairbanks	CCHA	Pittsburgh Penguins
5	126	Shane Sims ^{†}	Ohio State	CCHA	New York Islanders
5	130	Brett Bennett ^{†}	Boston University	Hockey East	Phoenix Coyotes
5	134	David Meckler	Yale	ECAC Hockey	Los Angeles Kings
5	135	Alex Kangas ^{†}	Minnesota	WCHA	Atlanta Thrashers
5	136	Nick Sucharski	Michigan State	CCHA	Columbus Blue Jackets
5	138	David McIntyre ^{†}	Colgate	ECAC Hockey	Dallas Stars
5	140	Cody Wild	Providence	Hockey East	New Jersey Devils
5	144	Martin Nolet ^{†}	Massachusetts	Hockey East	Los Angeles Kings
5	145	Jon Rheault	Providence	Hockey East	Philadelphia Flyers
5	146	Mark Dekanich	Colgate	ECAC Hockey	Nashville Predators
5	147	Alex Biega	Harvard	ECAC Hockey	Buffalo Sabres
6	154	Matt McCollem ^{†}	Harvard	ECAC Hockey	St. Louis Blues
6	157	Brent Gwidt ^{†}	Nebraska–Omaha	CCHA	Washington Capitals
6	161	Viktor Stålberg ^{†}	Vermont	Hockey East	Chicago Blackhawks
6	166	Tyler Ruegsegger ^{†}	Denver	WCHA	Toronto Maple Leafs
6	169	Chris Auger ^{†}	Massachusetts–Lowell	Hockey East	Chicago Blackhawks
6	176	Ryan Flynn ^{†}	Minnesota	WCHA	Nashville Predators
6	178	Tony Romano ^{†}	Cornell	ECAC Hockey	New Jersey Devils
6	179	Jordan Fulton ^{†}	Minnesota–Duluth	WCHA	Calgary Flames
6	183	Nick Dodge	Clarkson	ECAC Hockey	Carolina Hurricanes
7	186	Peter LeBlanc ^{†}	New Hampshire	Hockey East	Chicago Blackhawks
7	188	Chris Frank	Western Michigan	CCHA	Phoenix Coyotes
7	190	Troy Mattila ^{†}	Dartmouth	ECAC Hockey	New York Islanders
7	191	Nick Oslund ^{†}	St. Cloud State	WCHA	Detroit Red Wings
7	192	Chris Hickey ^{†}	Wisconsin	WCHA	Minnesota Wild
7	193	Marc Cheverie ^{†}	Denver	WCHA	Florida Panthers
7	195	Jesse Martin ^{†}	Denver	WCHA	Atlanta Thrashers
7	196	Benn Ferriero	Boston College	Hockey East	Phoenix Coyotes
7	201	Billy Sauer	Michigan	CCHA	Colorado Avalanche
7	202	John McCarthy	Boston University	Hockey East	San Jose Sharks
7	203	Jay Barriball ^{†}	Minnesota	WCHA	San Jose Sharks
7	210	Will O'Neill ^{†}	Maine	Hockey East	Atlanta Thrashers
7	211	Erik Condra	Notre Dame	CCHA	Ottawa Senators
7	213	Justin Krueger ^{†}	Cornell	ECAC Hockey	Carolina Hurricanes

† incoming freshman

== See also ==
- 2005–06 NCAA Division III men's ice hockey season
