= Marvin Degon =

American ice hockey player

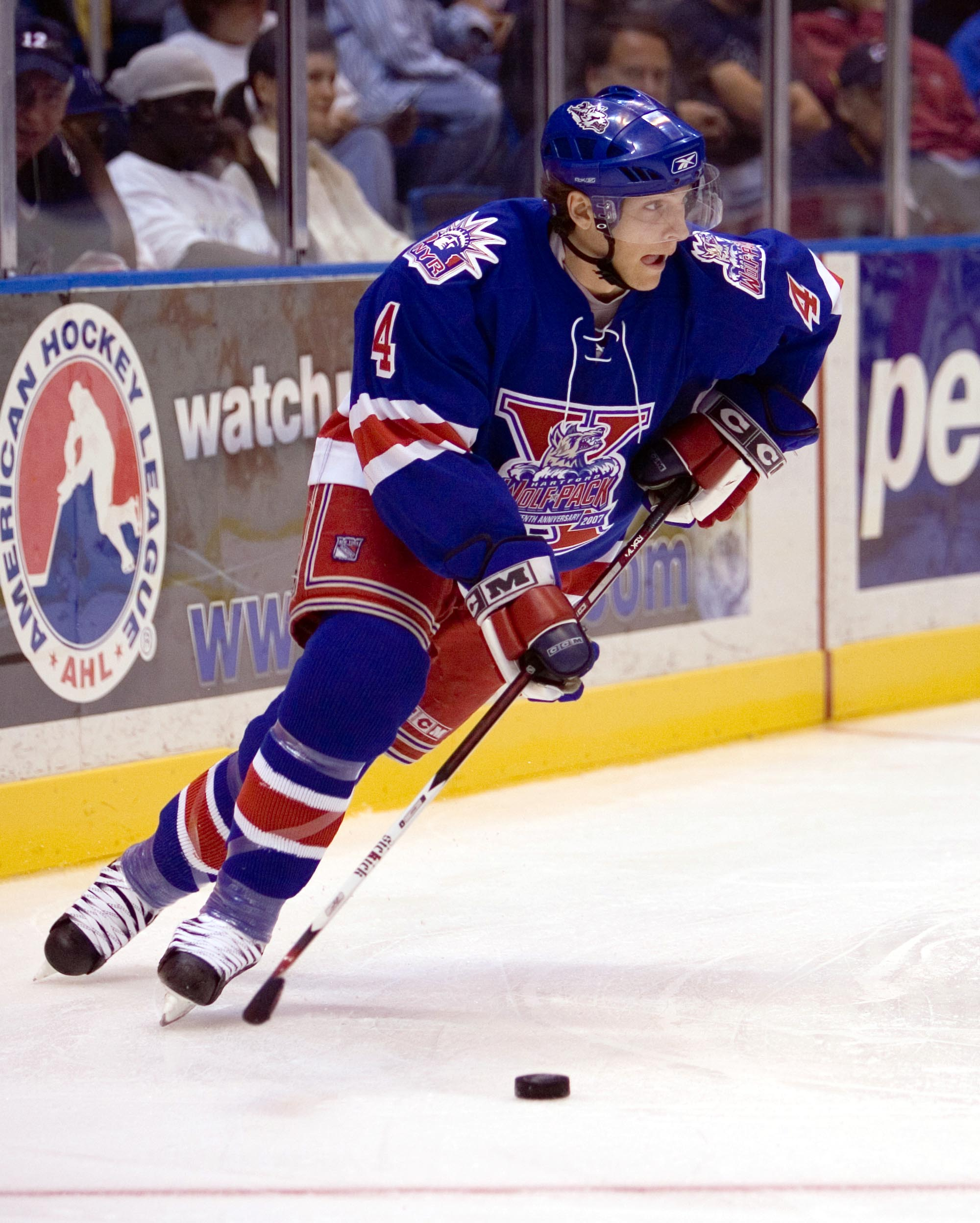
- Degon with the Hartford Wolf Pack in 2006
- Born: July 20, 1983 (age 41); Worcester, Massachusetts, U.S.
- Height: 5 ft 11 in (180 cm)
- Weight: 190 lb (86 kg; 13 st 8 lb)
- Position: Defense
- Shoots: Right
- EBEL team Former teams: HDD Olimpija Ljubljana; Hartford Wolf Pack; Hamilton Bulldogs; EHC Wolfsburg; Eisbären Berlin; ERC Ingolstadt; EC VSV; Providence Bruins; HC Milano
- NHL draft: Undrafted
- Playing career: 2006–present

Marvin Degon (born July 20, 1983, in Worcester, Massachusetts) is an American professional ice hockey defenseman, currently playing for HDD Olimpija Ljubljana of the Austrian Hockey League (EBEL).

== Playing career ==
Degon attended the University of Massachusetts Amherst where he played four years of college hockey with the UMass Minutemen men's ice hockey team from 2002-06.

Undrafted following college, Degon stepped right in the American Hockey League to play with the Hartford Wolf Pack the final games of the 2005–06 AHL season and playoffs.

On July 5, 2007 Degon was signed as a free agent by the Montreal Canadiens who assigned him to their AHL affiliate, the Hamilton Bulldogs, for the 2007–08 AHL season.

On August 18, 2014, Degon returned to the EBEL, signing with Slovenian club HDD Olimpija Ljubljana; he began with a one-year deal.

== Career statistics ==
			Regular season					Playoffs
Season	Team	League	GP	G	A	Pts	PIM	GP	G	A	Pts	PIM
2002–03	UMass Minutemen	HE	36	2	14	16	14	—	—	—	—	—
2003–04	UMass Minutemen	HE	36	5	15	20	18	—	—	—	—	—
2004–05	UMass Minutemen	HE	38	10	8	18	44	—	—	—	—	—
2005–06	UMass Minutemen	HE	36	10	19	29	33	—	—	—	—	—
2005–06	Hartford Wolf Pack	AHL	14	2	4	6	4	13	0	5	5	6
2006–07	Hartford Wolf Pack	AHL	71	8	26	34	40	7	0	1	1	0
2007–08	Hamilton Bulldogs	AHL	79	9	22	31	56	—	—	—	—	—
2008–09	Grizzly Adams Wolfsburg	DEL	52	11	29	40	42	10	3	2	5	8
2009–10	Eisbären Berlin	DEL	55	4	19	23	32	5	1	1	2	2
2010–11	ERC Ingolstadt	DEL	27	2	7	9	16	—	—	—	—	—
2010–11	EC VSV	EBEL	12	2	2	4	0	10	1	1	2	2
2011–12	Reading Royals	ECHL	22	4	7	11	12	—	—	—	—	—
2011–12	Providence Bruins	AHL	2	0	0	0	0	—	—	—	—	—
2011–12	Grizzly Adams Wolfsburg	DEL	27	2	11	13	10	3	0	0	0	0
2012–13	HC Milano	ITL	41	5	12	17	48	—	—	—	—	—
2012–13	Trenton Titans	ECHL	23	1	3	4	4	—	—	—	—	—
2013–14	Elmira Jackals	ECHL	12	0	5	5	6	—	—	—	—	—
2013–14	Reading Royals	ECHL	55	8	26	34	27	5	0	1	1	0
2014–15	HDD Olimpija Ljubljana	EBEL	54	5	15	20	36	—	—	—	—	—
AHL totals			166	19	52	71	100	20	0	6	6	6

== Awards and honors ==
Award	Year
All-Hockey East Second Team	2005–06
