= 2005–06 NCAA Division I men's ice hockey rankings =

- NCAA tournament: 2006
- NCAA champion: Wisconsin
- Preseason No. 1 (USA Today): Minnesota
- Preseason No. 1 (USCHO): Denver
- NCAA Division I men's ice hockey rankings

Two human polls made up the 2005–06 NCAA Division I men's ice hockey rankings, the USCHO.com/CSTV Division I Men's Poll and the USA TODAY/USA Hockey Magazine Poll. As the 2005–06 season progressed, rankings were updated weekly. There were a total of 34 voters in the USA Today poll and 40 voters in the USCHO.com poll. Each first place vote in the USA Today poll is worth 15 points in the rankings while a first place vote in the USCHO.com poll is worth 20 points with every subsequent vote worth 1 fewer point in either poll.

== Legend ==
	Increase in ranking
	Decrease in ranking
	Not ranked previous week
(Italics)	Number of first place votes
#–#–#	Win–loss–tie record
†	Tied with team above or below also with this symbol

== USA TODAY/USA Hockey Magazine Poll ==
	Preseason Oct 3	Week 1 Oct 10	Week 2 Oct 17	Week 3 Oct 24	Week 4 Oct 31	Week 5 Nov 7	Week 6 Nov 14	Week 7 Nov 21	Week 8 Nov 28	Week 9 Dec 5	Week 10 Dec 12	Week 11 Dec 19	Week 12 Jan 2	Week 13 Jan 9	Week 14 Jan 16	Week 15 Jan 23	Week 16 Jan 30	Week 17 Feb 6	Week 18 Feb 13	Week 19 Feb 20	Week 20 Feb 27	Week 21 Mar 6	Week 22 Mar 13	Week 23 Mar 20	Week 24 Mar 27	Final Apr 10	
1	Minnesota (17)	Minnesota (19) 0–0–0	Michigan (19) 4–0–0	Michigan (23) 4–0–1	Colorado College (27) 7–1–0	Colorado College (30) 9–1–0	Michigan (29) 9–1–1	Michigan (31) 9–1–1	Wisconsin (34) 11–1–2	Wisconsin (34) 13–1–2	Wisconsin (21) 14–2–2	Wisconsin (28) 14–2–2	Wisconsin (33) 16–2–2	Wisconsin (34) 16–2–2	Wisconsin (34) 18–2–2	Boston College (28) 16–4–2	Miami (19) 19–4–4	Minnesota (24) 18–6–4	Minnesota (21) 19–6–5	Minnesota (34) 21–6–5	Minnesota (34) 23–6–5	Minnesota (34) 25–6–5	Minnesota (34) 27–6–5	Boston University (19) 25–9–4	Wisconsin (28) 28–10–3	Wisconsin (34) 30–10–3	1
2	Denver (14)	Denver (15) 0–0–0	Ohio State (8) 1–1–0	Colorado College (2) 5–1–0	Maine (2) 7–1–0	Michigan (2) 7–1–1	Wisconsin (5) 7–1–2	Wisconsin (3) 9–1–2	Colorado College; 12–3–1	Miami; 11–2–1	Miami (13) 12–2–2	Miami (6) 12–2–2	Miami (1) 13–2–3	Minnesota; 13–5–4	Boston College; 14–4–2	Wisconsin (2) 18–4–2	Minnesota (13) 18–6–4	Miami (10) 20–5–4	Miami (9) 20–5–4	Wisconsin; 21–7–3	Miami; 21–7–4	Miami; 23–7–4	Miami; 25–7–4	Wisconsin (12) 26–10–3	North Dakota (4) 29–15–1	Boston College; 26–13–3	2
3	Ohio State † (2)	Ohio State; 0–0–0	Cornell (5) 0–0–0	Cornell (3) 0–0–0	Michigan (4) 5–1–1	Cornell (2) 3–1–0	Colorado College; 9–2–1	Colorado College; 11–2–1	Michigan; 9–3–1	Vermont; 11–3–1	Vermont; 11–3–1	Minnesota; 9–5–4	Minnesota; 11–5–4	Miami; 14–3–3	Minnesota; 14–6–4	Miami (4) 17–4–4	Boston College (2) 17–5–2	Boston College; 17–6–2	Wisconsin (1) 20–7–2	Miami; 20–7–4	Boston University; 19–9–4	Boston University; 21–9–4	Boston University; 23–9–4	Michigan State; 24–11–8	Boston College (2) 25–12–3	North Dakota; 29–16–1	3
4	Cornell †	Cornell; 0–0–0	Colorado College (2) 3–1–0	Ohio State (3) 2–1–1	Cornell (1) 1–1–0	Maine; 8–2–0	Maine; 9–3–0	Maine; 9–3–0	Minnesota; 7–3–4	North Dakota; 10–5–1	Minnesota; 9–5–4	Boston College; 9–4–1	Vermont; 13–4–1	Boston College; 12–4–2	Miami; 15–4–4	Minnesota; 16–6–4	Wisconsin; 18–6–2	Wisconsin †; 19–7–2	Boston College (1) 19–6–2	Boston University; 19–9–2	Colorado College; 23–12–1	Wisconsin; 23–9–3	Wisconsin; 25–9–3	Minnesota (2) 27–8–5	Maine; 28–11–2	Maine; 28–12–2	4
5	Boston College (1)	Boston College; 0–0–0	Maine; 3–1–0	Maine (3) 5–1–0	North Dakota; 5–2–1	Wisconsin; 6–1–1	Boston College; 4–2–1	Vermont; 9–2–0	Vermont; 10–3–0	Colorado College; 12–5–1	Boston College; 9–4–1	Vermont; 11–4–1	Colorado College; 17–6–1	Colorado College; 17–6–1	Vermont; 15–5–2	Cornell; 13–4–2	Cornell; 14–4–3	Cornell †; 16–4–3	Boston University; 17–8–2	Colorado College; 21–12–1	Michigan State; 19–10–7	Michigan State; 20–10–8	Maine; 26–10–2	Miami; 26–8–4	Boston University; 26–10–4	Boston University; 26–10–4	5
6	North Dakota	Colorado College; 2–0–0	North Dakota; 3–1–0	North Dakota; 4–1–1	Minnesota; 3–2–1	Michigan State; 5–1–1	Cornell; 4–2–0	Boston College; 5–3–1	Boston College; 6–3–1	Michigan; 9–5–1	Michigan; 11–5–1	Michigan; 11–5–1	Boston College; 10–4–2	Vermont; 13–5–2	Michigan; 13–7–1	North Dakota; 17–10–1	Michigan; 14–9–3	Boston University; 15–8–2	Cornell; 16–5–4	Michigan State; 19–10–7	Wisconsin; 21–9–3	Maine; 24–10–2	Michigan State; 22–11–8	North Dakota (1) 27–15–1	Michigan State; 25–12–8	Michigan State; 25–12–8	6
7	Colorado College	Michigan; 2–0–0	Boston College; 1–1–0	Minnesota; 2–1–1	Vermont; 6–0–0	Denver; 5–3–0	New Hampshire; 6–3–1	Minnesota; 6–3–3	Maine; 9–4–0	Boston College; 7–4–1	Colorado College; 13–6–1	Colorado College; 15–6–1	Michigan; 12–6–1	Maine; 14–6–0	Colorado College; 17–8–1	Vermont; 15–7–2	Colorado College; 17–10–1	Michigan; 16–10–3	Denver; 18–10–2	Maine; 21–10–1	Maine; 23–10–1	Denver; 20–13–3	Cornell; 20–7–4	Harvard; 21–11–2	Cornell; 22–9–4	Cornell; 22–9–4	7
8	Michigan	New Hampshire; 0–0–0	Minnesota; 0–1–1	Michigan State; 2–0–1	Michigan State; 3–1–1	Vermont; 7–1–0	North Dakota; 7–4–1	North Dakota; 8–5–1	Miami; 9–2–1	Minnesota; 7–5–4	Maine; 11–5–0	Maine; 11–5–0	Cornell; 9–3–2	Cornell; 10–3–2	Cornell; 11–4–2	Michigan; 14–9–1	Maine; 17–9–0	Colorado College; 18–11–1	Michigan; 18–11–3	Boston College; 19–9–2	Cornell; 18–7–4	Cornell; 18–7–4	North Dakota; 25–15–1	Boston College; 23–12–3	Minnesota; 27–9–5	Minnesota; 27–9–5	8
9	New Hampshire	North Dakota; 1–1–0	Denver; 0–2–0	Denver; 2–2–0	Denver; 3–3–0	Boston College; 3–2–1	Vermont; 8–2–0	New Hampshire; 7–4–1	North Dakota; 8–5–1	New Hampshire; 8–5–3	North Dakota; 10–7–1	North Dakota; 12–7–1	Maine; 12–6–0	Michigan; 13–7–1	New Hampshire; 12–7–4	Colorado College; 17–10–1	Providence; 14–9–1	Denver; 16–10–2	Colorado College; 19–12–1	Cornell; 17–6–4	Boston College; 20–10–2	Colorado College; 23–13–2	Boston College; 22–11–3	Cornell; 21–8–4	Miami; 26–9–4	Miami; 26–9–4	9
10	Wisconsin	Boston University; 0–0–0	Michigan State; 2–0–0	Boston College; 1–1–1	Wisconsin; 4–1–1	Miami; 5–1–0	Minnesota; 5–3–2	Miami; 7–2–1	New Hampshire; 7–4–2	Denver †; 8–6–2	Cornell; 8–3–1	Cornell; 8–3–1	North Dakota; 13–8–1	North Dakota; 14–9–1	North Dakota; 15–10–1	New Hampshire; 13–8–4	Boston University; 14–8–2	Vermont; 17–8–3	Michigan State; 17–10–7	North Dakota; 20–13–1	North Dakota; 21–14–1	North Dakota; 23–14–1	New Hampshire; 20–11–7	Maine; 26–11–2	Harvard; 21–12–2	Harvard; 21–12–2	10
11	Maine	Wisconsin; 1–1–0	Boston University; 1–0–0	Vermont; 4–0–0	Boston College; 2–2–1	North Dakota; 5–4–1	Miami; 6–2–0	Cornell; 4–3–1	Cornell; 6–3–1	Maine †; 9–5–0	Colgate; 10–2–3	Colgate; 10–2–3	St. Lawrence; 12–6–1	New Hampshire; 10–7–4	St. Lawrence; 14–7–1	Maine; 15–9–0	Vermont; 16–8–2	North Dakota; 18–13–1	Maine; 19–10–1	Denver; 18–12–2	Denver; 19–13–2	Nebraska-Omaha; 20–12–6	Michigan; 20–13–5	New Hampshire; 20–12–7	Colorado College; 24–16–2	Colorado College; 24–16–2	11
12	Boston University	Northern Michigan; 0–0–0	New Hampshire; 1–1–0	Wisconsin; 2–1–1	New Hampshire; 2–2–1	New Hampshire; 4–3–1	Denver; 5–4–1	St. Lawrence; 9–3–0	St. Lawrence; 10–4–0	Colgate; 10–2–3	New Hampshire; 9–6–3	Denver; 11–7–2	Providence; 11–6–1	Providence; 12–7–1	Maine; 14–8–0	Providence; 13–9–1	Denver; 16–10–2	Maine; 18–10–0	North Dakota; 18–13–1	Michigan; 18–12–4	New Hampshire; 17–11–6	New Hampshire; 18–11–7	Harvard; 19–11–2	Michigan; 21–14–5	Michigan; 21–15–5	Michigan; 21–15–5	12
13	Northern Michigan	Michigan State; 2–0–0	Wisconsin; 1–1–0	New Hampshire; 1–2–1	Northern Michigan; 5–1–0	Minnesota; 3–3–2	Michigan State; 5–3–2	Denver; 5–5–2	Colgate; 8–2–3	Cornell; 8–3–1	Denver; 9–7–2	New Hampshire; 9–6–3	Harvard; 10–6–1	Clarkson; 12–6–2	Providence; 12–8–1	Denver; 14–10–2	North Dakota; 17–12–1	Michigan State; 16–10–7	Vermont; 17–9–4	Nebraska-Omaha; 18–11–5	Michigan; 18–12–4	Boston College; 20–11–3	Colorado College; 24–15–2	Colorado College; 24–15–2	New Hampshire; 20–13–7	New Hampshire; 20–13–7	13
14	Dartmouth	Maine; 1–1–0	Vermont; 2–0–0	Northern Michigan; 3–1–0	Ohio State; 2–3–1	Boston University; 3–2–0	Alaska-Fairbanks; 4–2–2	Harvard; 6–2–0	Harvard; 7–3–1	St. Lawrence; 11–5–0	Harvard; 9–4–1	St. Lawrence; 12–6–1	Colgate; 10–3–4	Lake Superior State; 12–6–4	Lake Superior State; 12–6–4	Boston University; 12–8–2	Michigan State; 14–10–7	Providence; 14–10–2	Providence; 15–11–2	New Hampshire; 16–11–5	Harvard; 17–10–2	Michigan; 18–13–5	Denver; 21–15–3	St. Cloud State; 22–16–4	Holy Cross; 27–10–2	Holy Cross; 27–10–2	14
15	Harvard	Harvard; 0–0–0	Bemidji State; 4–0–0	Bemidji State; 4–0–0	Miami; 3–1–0	Alaska-Fairbanks; 4–2–2	St. Lawrence; 7–3–0	Colgate; 7–2–2	Denver; 6–6–2	Clarkson †; 9–4–1	Clarkson; 10–5–1	Clarkson; 10–5–1	Ohio State; 10–6–3	St. Lawrence; 12–7–1	Boston University; 10–8–2	Michigan State; 14–9–5	New Hampshire; 13–9–4	New Hampshire; 14–10–4	Nebraska-Omaha; 17–11–4	Vermont; 18–10–4	Nebraska-Omaha; 18–12–6	Harvard; 17–10–2	Dartmouth; 18–11–2	Denver; 21–15–3	St. Cloud State; 22–16–4	St. Cloud State; 22–16–4	15
16										Providence †; 8–6–1																	16
	Preseason Oct 3	Week 1 Oct 10	Week 2 Oct 17	Week 3 Oct 24	Week 4 Oct 31	Week 5 Nov 7	Week 6 Nov 14	Week 7 Nov 21	Week 8 Nov 28	Week 9 Dec 5	Week 10 Dec 12	Week 11 Dec 19	Week 12 Jan 2	Week 13 Jan 9	Week 14 Jan 16	Week 15 Jan 23	Week 16 Jan 30	Week 17 Feb 6	Week 18 Feb 13	Week 19 Feb 20	Week 20 Feb 27	Week 21 Mar 6	Week 22 Mar 13	Week 23 Mar 20	Week 24 Mar 27	Final Apr 10	
		Dropped: Dartmouth; 0–0–0	Dropped: Northern Michigan; 1–1–0; Harvard; 0–0–0	Dropped: Boston University; 1–1–0	Dropped: Bemidji State; 5–1–0	Dropped: Northern Michigan; 5–3–0; Ohio State; 2–5–1	Dropped: Boston University; 3–4–0	Dropped: Michigan State; 5–5–2; Alaska-Fairbanks; 5–3–2	Dropped: None	Dropped: Harvard; 7–4–1	Dropped: St. Lawrence; 11–6–1; Providence; 9–6–1	Dropped: Harvard; 9–5–1	Dropped: Denver; 11–9–2; New Hampshire; 9–7–3; Clarkson; 10–6–2	Dropped: Harvard; 10–7–2; Colgate; 10–5–5; Ohio State; 10–8–3	Dropped: Clarkson; 12–8–2	Dropped: St. Lawrence; 14–9–1; Lake Superior State; 12–7–5	Dropped: None	Dropped: None	Dropped: New Hampshire; 15–10–5	Dropped: Providence; 16–12–2	Dropped: Vermont; 18–10–6	Dropped: None	Dropped: Nebraska-Omaha; 20–14–6	Dropped: Dartmouth; 19–12–2	Dropped: Denver; 21–15–3	Dropped: None	

== USCHO.com/CSTV Division I Men's Poll ==
	Preseason Oct 3	Week 1 Oct 10	Week 2 Oct 17	Week 3 Oct 24	Week 4 Oct 31	Week 5 Nov 7	Week 6 Nov 14	Week 7 Nov 21	Week 8 Nov 28	Week 9 Dec 5	Week 10 Dec 12	Week 11 Dec 19	Week 12 Jan 2	Week 13 Jan 9	Week 14 Jan 16	Week 15 Jan 23	Week 16 Jan 30	Week 17 Feb 6	Week 18 Feb 13	Week 19 Feb 20	Week 20 Feb 27	Week 21 Mar 6	Week 22 Mar 13	Week 23 Mar 20	
1	Denver (17)	Minnesota (15) 0–0–0	Michigan (21) 4–0–0	Michigan (27) 4–0–1	Colorado College (30) 7–1–0	Colorado College (39) 9–1–0	Michigan (29) 9–1–1	Michigan (31) 9–1–1	Wisconsin (39) 11–1–2	Wisconsin (40) 13–1–2	Wisconsin (24) 14–2–2	Wisconsin (33) 14–2–2	Wisconsin (37) 16–2–2	Wisconsin (40) 16–2–2	Wisconsin (40) 18–2–2	Boston College (27) 16–4–2	Miami (20) 19–4–4	Minnesota (29) 18–6–4	Minnesota (24) 19–6–5	Minnesota (37) 21–6–5	Minnesota (38) 23–6–5	Minnesota (39) 25–6–5	Minnesota (39) 27–6–5	Boston University (20) 25–9–4	1
2	Minnesota (13)	Denver (23) 0–0–0	Cornell (8) 0–0–0	Cornell (6) 0–0–0	Maine (4) 7–1–0	Michigan; 7–1–1	Wisconsin (7) 7–1–2	Wisconsin (8) 9–1–2	Colorado College (1) 12–3–1	Miami; 11–2–1	Miami (14) 12–2–2	Miami (6) 12–2–2	Miami (3) 13–2–3	Minnesota; 13–5–4	Boston College; 14–4–2	Wisconsin (11) 18–4–2	Minnesota (15) 18–6–4	Miami (7) 20–5–4	Miami (11) 20–5–4	Wisconsin (2) 21–7–3	Miami (2) 23–7–4	Miami (1) 23–7–4	Miami; 25–7–4	Wisconsin (15) 26–10–3	2
3	Boston College (2)	Cornell; 0–0–0	Ohio State (6) 1–1–0	Colorado College (2) 5–1–0	Michigan (5) 5–1–1	Cornell (1) 3–1–0	Colorado College (3) 9–2–1	Colorado College (1) 11–2–1	Michigan; 9–3–1	Vermont; 11–3–1	Vermont (2) 11–3–1	Minnesota; 9–5–4	Minnesota; 11–5–4	Miami; 14–3–3	Miami; 15–4–4	Miami (2) 17–4–4	Boston College (2) 17–5–2	Cornell (1) 16–4–3	Wisconsin (5) 20–7–2	Miami (1) 21–7–4	Boston University; 19–9–4	Boston University; 21–9–4	Wisconsin (1) 25–9–3	Minnesota (5) 27–8–5	3
4	Cornell	Boston College (1) 0–0–0	Colorado College (1) 3–1–0	Ohio State (3) 2–1–1	Cornell (1) 1–1–0	Maine; 8–2–0	Maine (1) 9–3–0	Maine; 9–3–0	Minnesota; 7–3–4	Colorado College; 12–5–1	Minnesota; 9–5–4	Boston College (1) 9–4–1	Vermont; 13–4–1	Boston College; 12–4–2	Minnesota; 14–6–4	Minnesota; 16–6–4	Wisconsin (3) 18–6–2	Wisconsin (3) 19–7–2	Boston College; 19–6–2	Boston University; 19–9–2	Michigan State; 20–10–8	Wisconsin; 23–9–3	Boston University; 23–9–4	Michigan State; 24–11–8	4
5	Ohio State (2)	Ohio State (1) 0–0–0	Maine; 3–1–0	Maine (1) 5–1–0	North Dakota; 5–2–1	Wisconsin; 6–1–1	Cornell; 4–2–0	Vermont; 9–2–0	Vermont; 10–3–0	North Dakota; 10–5–1	Boston College; 9–4–1	Vermont; 11–4–1	Boston College; 10–4–2	Colorado College; 17–6–1	Vermont; 15–5–2	Cornell; 13–4–2	Cornell; 14–4–3	Boston College; 17–6–2	Boston University; 17–8–2	Michigan State; 19–10–7	Colorado College †; 23–12–1	Michigan State; 20–10–8	Michigan State; 22–11–8	Miami; 26–8–4	5
6	Colorado College	Colorado College; 2–0–0	Boston College; 1–1–0	North Dakota; 4–1–1	Vermont; 6–0–0	Michigan State; 5–1–1	Boston College; 4–2–1	Boston College; 5–2–1	Boston College; 6–3–1	Boston College; 7–4–1	Michigan; 11–5–1	Michigan; 11–5–1	Colorado College; 17–6–1	Vermont; 13–5–2	Michigan; 13–7–1	Michigan; 14–9–1	Michigan; 14–9–3	Boston University; 15–8–2	Cornell; 16–5–4	Colorado College; 21–12–1	Wisconsin †; 21–9–3	Maine; 24–10–2	Maine; 26–10–2	North Dakota; 27–15–1	6
7	North Dakota (1)	Michigan; 2–0–0	Minnesota; 0–1–1	Minnesota; 2–1–1	Minnesota; 3–2–1	Denver; 5–3–0	North Dakota; 7–4–1	Minnesota; 6–3–3	Maine; 9–4–0	Michigan; 9–5–1	Colorado College; 13–6–1	Colorado College; 15–6–1	Michigan; 12–6–1	Cornell; 10–3–2	Colorado College; 17–8–1	North Dakota; 17–10–1	Colorado College; 17–10–1	Michigan; 16–10–3	Denver; 18–10–2	Cornell; 17–6–4	Maine; 23–10–1	Cornell; 18–7–4	Cornell; 20–7–4	Harvard; 21–11–2	7
8	Michigan	New Hampshire; 0–0–0	North Dakota; 3–1–0	Boston College; 1–1–1	Michigan State; 3–1–1	Boston College; 3–2–1	Vermont; 8–2–0	North Dakota; 8–5–1	Miami; 9–2–1	Minnesota; 7–5–4	Cornell; 8–3–1	Cornell; 8–3–1	Cornell; 9–3–2	Michigan; 13–7–1	Cornell; 11–4–2	Vermont; 15–7–2	Boston University; 14–8–2	Colorado College; 18–11–1	Michigan; 18–11–3	Maine; 21–10–1	Cornell; 18–7–4	Denver; 20–13–3	North Dakota; 25–15–1	Cornell; 21–8–4	8
9	New Hampshire	North Dakota; 1–1–0	Denver (1) 0–2–0	Denver; 2–2–0	Wisconsin; 4–1–1	Vermont; 7–1–0	New Hampshire; 6–3–1	New Hampshire; 7–4–1	North Dakota; 8–5–1	Cornell; 8–3–1	Maine; 11–5–0	Maine; 11–5–0	North Dakota; 13–8–1	Maine; 14–6–0	North Dakota; 15–10–1	Colorado College; 17–10–1	Providence; 14–9–1	Denver; 16–10–2	Colorado College; 19–12–1	Boston College; 19–9–2	Boston College; 20–10–2	Colorado College; 23–13–2	New Hampshire; 20–11–7	Boston College; 23–12–3	9
10	Wisconsin (1)	Michigan State; 2–0–0	Michigan State (1) 2–0–0	Michigan State (1) 2–0–1	Denver; 3–3–0	North Dakota; 5–4–1	Minnesota; 5–3–2	Miami; 7–2–1	New Hampshire; 7–4–2	Maine; 9–5–0	North Dakota; 10–7–1	North Dakota; 12–7–1	Maine; 12–6–0	North Dakota; 14–9–1	St. Lawrence; 14–7–1	New Hampshire; 13–8–4	Denver; 16–10–2	Michigan State; 16–10–7	Michigan State; 17–10–7	Nebraska-Omaha; 18–11–5	Denver; 19–13–2	North Dakota; 23–14–1	Boston College; 22–11–3	Maine; 26–11–2	10
11	Maine	Wisconsin; 1–1–0	New Hampshire; 1–1–0	Vermont; 4–0–0	Boston College; 2–2–1	Miami; 5–1–0	Denver; 5–4–1	Cornell; 4–3–1	Cornell; 6–3–1	Denver; 8–6–2	Colgate; 10–2–3	Colgate; 10–2–3	St. Lawrence; 12–6–1	Providence; 12–7–1	New Hampshire; 12–7–4	Providence; 13–9–1	North Dakota; 17–12–1	North Dakota; 18–13–1	Maine; 19–10–1	Michigan; 18–12–4	North Dakota; 21–14–1	Nebraska-Omaha; 20–12–6	Michigan; 20–13–5	Michigan; 21–14–5	11
12	Northern Michigan	Maine; 1–1–0	Boston University; 1–0–0	Wisconsin; 2–1–1	New Hampshire; 2–2–1	Minnesota; 3–3–2	Miami; 6–2–0	St. Lawrence; 9–3–0	St. Lawrence; 10–4–0	New Hampshire; 8–5–3	New Hampshire; 9–6–3	St. Lawrence; 12–6–1	Colgate; 10–3–4	New Hampshire; 10–7–4	Maine; 14–8–0	Maine; 15–9–0	Maine; 17–9–0	Vermont; 17–8–3	North Dakota; 18–13–1	North Dakota †; 20–13–1	Nebraska-Omaha; 18–12–6	Harvard; 17–10–2	Harvard; 19–11–2	Colorado College; 24–15–2	12
13	Boston University	Northern Michigan; 0–0–0	Wisconsin; 1–1–0	New Hampshire; 1–2–1	Ohio State; 2–3–1	New Hampshire; 4–3–1	Michigan State; 5–3–2	Denver; 5–5–2	Colgate; 8–2–3	Colgate; 10–2–3	Denver; 9–7–2	Denver; 11–7–2	Providence; 11–6–1	St. Lawrence; 12–7–1	Providence; 12–8–1	Boston University; 12–8–2	Vermont; 16–8–2	Providence; 14–10–2	Nebraska-Omaha; 17–11–4	Denver †; 18–12–2	Harvard; 17–10–2	New Hampshire; 18–11–7	Colorado College; 24–15–2	New Hampshire; 20–12–7	13
14	Dartmouth	Boston University; 0–0–0	Bemidji State; 4–0–0	Northern Michigan; 3–1–0	Northern Michigan; 5–1–0	Boston University; 3–2–0	Alaska-Fairbanks; 4–2–2	Harvard; 6–2–0	Harvard; 7–3–1	St. Lawrence; 11–5–0	Harvard; 9–4–1	New Hampshire; 9–6–3	Harvard; 10–6–1	Clarkson; 12–6–2	Lake Superior State; 12–6–4	St. Lawrence †; 14–9–1	Michigan State; 14–10–7	Maine; 18–10–0	St. Cloud State; 17–10–3	New Hampshire; 16–11–5	Michigan; 18–13–5	Boston College; 20–11–3	Denver; 21–15–3	St. Cloud State; 22–16–4	14
15	Harvard	Dartmouth; 0–0–0	Vermont; 2–0–0	Bemidji State; 4–0–0	Harvard; 1–0–0	Alaska-Fairbanks; 4–2–2	St. Lawrence; 7–3–0	Colgate; 7–2–2	Denver; 6–6–2	Harvard; 7–4–1	St. Lawrence; 11–6–1	Clarkson; 10–5–1	New Hampshire; 9–7–3	Lake Superior State; 12–6–4	Harvard; 10–7–2	Denver †; 14–10–2	Lake Superior State; 14–7–5	St. Cloud State; 16–9–3	Vermont; 17–9–4	Harvard; 15–10–2	New Hampshire; 17–11–6	Michigan; 18–13–5	Dartmouth; 18–11–2	Nebraska-Omaha; 20–14–6	15
16	Massachusetts-Lowell	Colgate; 1–0–0	Northern Michigan; 1–1–0	Boston University; 1–1–0	Miami; 3–1–0	St. Lawrence; 6–2–0	Bemidji State; 7–1–0	Alaska-Fairbanks; 5–3–2	Alaska-Fairbanks; 6–4–2	Clarkson; 9–4–1	Clarkson; 10–5–1	Harvard; 9–5–1	Ohio State; 10–6–3	Colgate; 10–5–5	Boston University; 10–8–2	Michigan State; 14–9–5	New Hampshire; 13–9–4	New Hampshire; 14–10–4	Providence; 15–11–2	Vermont; 18–10–4	Colgate; 18–10–6	Dartmouth; 16–11–2	Northern Michigan; 22–14–2	Denver; 21–15–3	16
17	Michigan State	Harvard; 0–0–0	Dartmouth; 0–0–0	Dartmouth; 0–0–0	Alaska-Fairbanks; 3–2–1	Colgate; 5–1–1	Colgate; 6–2–1	Bemidji State; 8–2–0	Bemidji State; 8–2–0	Bemidji State; 9–3–0	Providence; 9–6–1	Providence; 9–6–1	Denver; 11–9–2	Harvard; 10–7–2	Colgate; 11–6–5	Harvard; 10–7–2	Colgate; 15–6–5	Harvard; 12–8–2	New Hampshire; 15–10–5	Providence; 16–12–2	Vermont †; 18–10–6	Colgate; 18–10–6	Colgate; 20–11–6	Dartmouth; 19–12–2	17
18	Colgate	Massachusetts-Lowell; 1–1–0	Harvard; 0–0–0	St. Lawrence; 3–1–0	Bemidji State; 5–1–0	Bemidji State; 5–1–0	Boston University; 3–4–0	Michigan State; 5–5–3	Clarkson; 9–4–1	Boston University; 5–6–2	Lake Superior State; 9–5–4	Lake Superior State; 10–6–4	Clarkson; 10–6–2	Denver; 11–9–2	Northern Michigan; 13–10–1	Colgate; 13–6–5	St. Lawrence; 15–10–1	Nebraska-Omaha; 15–11–4	Harvard; 13–9–2	St. Lawrence; 18–12–2	Dartmouth †; 16–11–2	Northern Michigan; 20–14–2	St. Cloud State; 20–15–4	Northern Michigan; 22–16–2	18
19	Vermont †	Vermont; 0–0–0	Alaska-Fairbanks (1) 1–0–1	Miami; 3–1–0	Boston University; 1–2–0	Northern Michigan; 5–3–0	Harvard; 3–2–0	Clarkson; 8–3–1	Ferris State; 7–3–4	Providence; 8–6–1	Bemidji State; 9–4–1	Ohio State; 9–6–2	Lake Superior State; 10–6–4	Ferris State; 9–6–5	Denver †; 12–10–2	Lake Superior State; 12–7–5	St. Cloud State; 14–9–3	Lake Superior State; 14–8–6	Lake Superior State; 15–9–6	St. Cloud State; 17–12–3	St. Cloud State; 18–12–4	Ferris State; 17–13–8	Nebraska-Omaha; 20–14–6	Holy Cross; 26–9–2	19
20	Minnesota-Duluth †	Bemidji State; 2–0–0	St. Lawrence; 3–1–0	Alaska-Fairbanks; 2–1–1	St. Lawrence; 4–2–0	Quinnipiac; 8–2–0	Northern Michigan; 5–5–0	Boston University; 3–4–1	Boston University; 4–5–2	Nebraska-Omaha; 9–6–0	Boston University; 6–7–2	Boston University; 6–7–2	Boston University †; 7–7–2	Ohio State; 10–8–3	Michigan State †; 12–8–5	Northern Michigan; 14–11–1	Harvard; 11–8–2	Ferris State; 14–10–6	Colgate; 15–9–6	Colgate; 16–10–6	Northern Michigan; 20–14–2	St. Cloud State; 18–14–4	Bemidji State †; 20–13–3	Colgate; 20–13–6	20
21													Ferris State †; 9–6–5										Holy Cross †; 24–9–2		21
	Preseason Oct 3	Week 1 Oct 10	Week 2 Oct 17	Week 3 Oct 24	Week 4 Oct 31	Week 5 Nov 7	Week 6 Nov 14	Week 7 Nov 21	Week 8 Nov 28	Week 9 Dec 5	Week 10 Dec 12	Week 11 Dec 19	Week 12 Jan 2	Week 13 Jan 9	Week 14 Jan 16	Week 15 Jan 23	Week 16 Jan 30	Week 17 Feb 6	Week 18 Feb 13	Week 19 Feb 20	Week 20 Feb 27	Week 21 Mar 6	Week 22 Mar 13	Week 23 Mar 20	
		Dropped: Minnesota-Duluth; 0–2–0	Dropped: Colgate; 1–1–1; Massachusetts-Lowell; 1–2–0	Dropped: Harvard; 0–0–0	Dropped: Dartmouth; 0–1–0	Dropped: Ohio State; 2–5–1; Harvard; 2–1–0	Dropped: Quinnipiac; 8–4–0	Dropped: Northern Michigan; 6–6–0	Dropped: Michigan State; 5–6–4	Dropped: Alaska-Fairbanks; 6–6–2; Ferris State; 7–5–4	Dropped: Nebraska-Omaha; 9–8–0	Dropped: Bemidji State; 9–6–1	Dropped: None	Dropped: Boston University; 8–8–2	Dropped: Clarkson; 12–8–2; Ferris State; 9–8–5; Ohio State; 11–9–4	Dropped: None	Dropped: Northern Michigan; 14–12–2	Dropped: Colgate; 15–8–5; St. Lawrence; 15–12–1	Dropped: Ferris State; 14–12–6	Dropped: Lake Superior State; 15–11–6	Dropped: Providence; 16–13–3; St. Lawrence; 18–14–2	Dropped: Vermont; 18–12–6	Dropped: Ferris State; 17–15–8	Dropped: Bemidji State; 20–13–3	
