= 2021–22 American International Yellow Jackets men's ice hockey season =

Atlantic Hockey, Champion Atlantic Hockey Tournament, Champion NCAA Tournament, Midwest Regional Semifinal
- Conference: 1st Atlantic Hockey
- Home ice: MassMutual Center

Rankings
- USCHO: 18
- USA Today: NR

Record
- Overall: 22–13–3
- Conference: 17–7–2
- Home: 13–5–2
- Road: 7–7–1
- Neutral: 2–1–0

Coaches and captains
- Head coach: Eric Lang
- Assistant coaches: Cory Schneider; Patrick Tabb; Matthew Woodward
- Captain: Parker Revering
- Alternate captain(s): Elijiah Barriga; Chris Dodero; Luka Maver; Jake Stella

The 2021–22 American International Yellow Jackets men's ice hockey season was the 74th season of play for the program. They represented American International College in the 2021–22 NCAA Division I men's ice hockey season and for the 19th season in the Atlantic Hockey conference. The Yellow Jackets were coached by Eric Lang, in his sixth season, and played their home games at MassMutual Center.

== Season ==
AIC entered the season looking to continue its run as the Atlantic Hockey champion but didn't get off to a good start. While due in part to the difficulty of their schedule, the Yellow Jackets began with just 3 wins in their first 13 games. While they got solid, if unspectacular, goaltending from both grad transfer Alec Calvaruso and nominal starter Jake Kucharski, American International was let down by its offense. In just 4 of those 13 games, the team managed to score more than 2 goals.

In late-November, the offense finally got going and the team went on an extended winning streak as a result. AIC won 11 consecutive games, including a defeat of Connecticut, who ended the season in the top-20. The run shot the Yellow Jackets to the top of the Atlantic Hockey standings, where they remained for the rest of the year. While their winning streak nearly put them into the poll themselves, AIC came back down to earth a bit at the end of the regular season. With their 4th-consecutive Atlantic Hockey title in hand, AIC still had to win the conference tournament in order to make the NCAA Tournament.

Prior to the start of their postseason, AIC got some unwelcome news when Kucharski went down with an undisclosed injury. Despite missing the conference goaltending champion, American International had a capable backup in Calvaruso and he showed up during the playoffs. Calvaruso won all four games for the Yellow Jackets, posting a 2.00 goals against average. It was, however, Blake Bennett who was the story for AIC; the junior forward scored recorded 10 points during their run, including a hat-trick in the semifinal against Mercyhurst, and was named Tournament MVP.

American International made its third consecutive appearance in the NCAA championship but, as is typical for Atlantic Hockey, they did so against the #1 seed once again. The team faced Michigan, who boasted one of, if not the, most talent-laden teams in NCAA history. The Yellow Jackets, on the other hand, possessed only one NHL-drafted player and he (Kucharski) was still out due to injury. Early on it appeared that the Wolverines would just roll over AIC when they scored twice in the first 5 minutes of the game. The Yellow Jackets fought back, however, and demonstrated that they weren't to be taken lightly. American International ended up outshooting Michigan 32-31 in the game and scored three goals, but it wasn't enough. Even with the loss, the credible performance showed that AIC could compete with the elite college hockey programs.

== Departures ==
Player	Position	Nationality	Cause
Jeff Baum	Forward/Defenseman	United States	Graduation (signed with Belfast Giants)
Stefano Durante	Goaltender	Canada	Graduation (signed with Fayetteville Marksmen)
Tobias Fladeby	Forward	Norway	Graduation (signed with Tingsryds AIF)
Kyle Jeffers	Forward	United States	Transferred to Lindenwood
Brennan Kapcheck	Defenseman	United States	Graduation (signed with Toronto Marlies)
Jan Kern	Forward	Czech Republic	Signed professional contract (HC Slavia Praha)
Sam Miller	Defenseman	United States	Transferred to Tufts
Matus Spodniak	Forward	Slovakia	Transferred to Adrian
Adam Stacho	Forward	Slovakia	Transferred to St. Norbert
Oskar Strömberg	Defenseman	Sweden	Graduation (signed with IK Waxholm)

== Recruiting ==
Player	Position	Nationality	Age	Notes
Alec Calvaruso	Goaltender	United States	23	Livonia, MI; graduate transfer from Rensselaer
Santeri Hartikainen	Forward	Finland	22	Helsinki, FIN; transfer from Robert Morris
Brian Kramer	Defenseman	United States	21	Wexford, PA; transfer from Robert Morris
Luis Lindner	Forward/Defenseman	Austria	20	Spittal an der Drau, AUT
Reggie Millette	Forward	United States	21	Jacksonville, FL
Brian Rigali	Forward	United States	24	Green Oaks, IL; graduate transfer from Connecticut
Evan Stella	Defenseman	Sweden	20	Karlstad, SWE
Alexander Tertyshny	Defenseman	United States	21	Philadelphia, PA
Chris Van Os-Shaw	Forward	Canada	24	Regina, SK; transfer from Minnesota State

== Roster ==
As of August 23, 2021.

No.	Nat.	Player	Class	Pos	Height	Weight	DoB	Hometown	Previous team	NHL rights
1	(United States)	Jake Kucharski	Sophomore (RS)	G	6' 4" (1.93 m)	220 lb (100 kg)	1999-09-25	Erie, Pennsylvania	Providence (HEA)	CAR, 197th overall 2018
2	(Canada)	Nico Somerville	Sophomore	D	5' 9" (1.75 m)	190 lb (86 kg)	1999-04-08	Nanaimo, British Columbia	Penticton (BCHL)	—
4	(United States)	Brett Callahan	Junior	D	5' 10" (1.78 m)	182 lb (83 kg)	1998-10-16	Westmont, Illinois	Jersey (NCDC)	—
5	(United States)	Alex Tertyshny	Freshman	D	6' 0" (1.83 m)	175 lb (79 kg)	2000-01-03	Philadelphia, Pennsylvania	Northeast (NAHL)	—
6	(United States)	Matt Rickard	Freshman	D	6' 0" (1.83 m)	170 lb (77 kg)	1999-07-28	Coventry, Rhode Island	Lone Star (NAHL)	—
7	(United States)	Brian Kramer	Freshman	D	5' 11" (1.8 m)	181 lb (82 kg)	2000-07-20	Wexford, Pennsylvania	Robert Morris (AHA)	—
8	(Austria)	Luis Lindner	Freshman	D	5' 11" (1.8 m)	170 lb (77 kg)	2001-05-16	Spittal an der Drau, Austria	Boston Jr. Bruins (NCDC)	—
9	(United States)	Blake Bennett	Junior	F	5' 8" (1.73 m)	195 lb (88 kg)	1998-07-01	Grand Island, New York	Corpus Christi (NAHL)	—
10	(United States)	Brian Rigali	Graduate	F	5' 8" (1.73 m)	185 lb (84 kg)	1997-03-08	Green Oaks, Illinois	UConn (HEA)	—
11	(Finland)	Julius Janhonen	Sophomore	F	6' 1" (1.85 m)	180 lb (82 kg)	1999-03-05	Espoo, Finland	HIFK U20 (Nuorten SM-liiga)	—
12	(United States)	Eric Otto	Junior (RS)	F	6' 1" (1.85 m)	175 lb (79 kg)	1997-07-19	Burnsville, Minnesota	Chicago (USHL)	—
13	(Finland)	Santeri Hartikainen	Sophomore	F	6' 2" (1.88 m)	190 lb (86 kg)	1999-01-05	Helsinki, Finland	Robert Morris (AHA)	—
16	(United States)	Reggie Millette	Freshman	F	5' 11" (1.8 m)	195 lb (88 kg)	2000-04-10	Jacksonville, Florida	Austin (NAHL)	—
17	(United States)	Zak Galambos	Junior (RS)	D	6' 2" (1.88 m)	185 lb (84 kg)	1997-04-04	Walnut Creek, California	Minnesota State (WCHA)	—
18	(United States)	Michal Stinil	Sophomore	F	5' 11" (1.8 m)	195 lb (88 kg)	1999-03-21	East Burke, Vermont	Lone Star (NAHL)	—
19	(United States)	Elijiah Barriga (A)	Senior (RS)	F	5' 11" (1.8 m)	193 lb (88 kg)	1996-05-16	West Covina, California	UNLV (ACHA)	—
20	(Canada)	Chris Van Os-Shaw	Senior	F	6' 2" (1.88 m)	200 lb (91 kg)	1997-05-20	Regina, Saskatchewan	Minnesota State (WCHA)	—
21	(United States)	Justin Cole	Graduate	F	6' 3" (1.91 m)	205 lb (93 kg)	1996-05-01	Bryn Athyn, Pennsylvania	Cedar Rapids (USHL)	—
22	(United States)	Parker Revering (C)	Senior	D	6' 1" (1.85 m)	200 lb (91 kg)	1997-01-11	Alexandria, Minnesota	Brookings (NAHL)	—
23	(United States)	Aaron Grounds	Sophomore	F	6' 2" (1.88 m)	190 lb (86 kg)	1999-12-24	Jamestown, North Dakota	Fargo (USHL)	—
25	(Slovenia)	Luka Maver (A)	Graduate	F	6' 3" (1.91 m)	195 lb (88 kg)	1997-10-25	Ljubljana, Slovenia	Lincoln (USHL)	—
26	(Canada)	Chris Theodore	Senior	F	5' 7" (1.7 m)	180 lb (82 kg)	1997-10-15	Beaconsfield, Quebec	Cornwall (CCHL)	—
27	(United States)	Hunter Johannes	Junior	F	6' 3" (1.91 m)	210 lb (95 kg)	1998-07-24	Eden Prairie, Minnesota	Jamestown (NAHL)	—
28	(Sweden)	Jake Stella (A)	Junior	F	6' 0" (1.83 m)	190 lb (86 kg)	1998-11-14	Karlstad, Sweden	Corpus Christi (NAHL)	—
29	(Canada)	Darwin Lakoduk	Sophomore	F	5' 10" (1.78 m)	157 lb (71 kg)	2000-01-28	Edmonton, Alberta	Penticton (BCHL)	—
30	(United States)	Alec Calvaruso	Graduate	G	6' 2" (1.88 m)	180 lb (82 kg)	1998-07-09	Livonia, Michigan	Rensselaer (ECAC)	—
33	(United States)	Jarrett Fiske	Junior	G	6' 4" (1.93 m)	190 lb (86 kg)	1999-05-28	Erie, Pennsylvania	Kemptville (CCHL)	—
34	(United States)	Ryan McInchak	Sophomore	G	6' 0" (1.83 m)	175 lb (79 kg)	1999-02-28	Trenton, Michigan	New Jersey (NAHL)	—
37	(Sweden)	Evan Stella	Freshman	D	5' 10" (1.78 m)	180 lb (82 kg)	2001-05-11	Karlstad, Sweden	Dubuque (USHL)	—
39	(Canada)	Justin Young	Graduate	F	6' 0" (1.83 m)	184 lb (83 kg)	1997-12-23	Leduc, Alberta	Alaska (WCHA)	—
44	(United States)	Austen Long	Junior	F	5' 11" (1.8 m)	175 lb (79 kg)	1998-02-15	Minneapolis, Minnesota	Omaha (USHL)	—
55	(United States)	Chris Dodero (A)	Graduate	F	5' 9" (1.75 m)	176 lb (80 kg)	1996-06-08	West Chicago, Illinois	Janesville (NAHL)	—

== Standings ==
2021–22 Atlantic Hockey Standings
	Conference record										Overall record					
	GP	W	L	T	OW	OL	SW	PTS	GF	GA	GP	W	L	T	GF	GA
#18 American International †*	26	17	7	2	1	2	0	54	97	61	38	22	13	3	134	95
Canisius	26	13	11	2	2	1	1	43	76	67	35	16	16	3	99	97
Army	26	12	11	3	0	1	2	42	75	68	35	14	17	4	98	100
RIT	26	12	10	4	1	3	3	41	69	82	38	18	16	4	92	115
Sacred Heart	26	11	12	3	0	1	3	40	72	70	37	15	18	4	95	100
Air Force	26	11	12	3	3	2	2	37	76	80	36	16	17	3	99	127
Mercyhurst	26	10	12	4	0	1	1	36	75	79	39	16	19	4	114	129
Niagara	26	10	13	3	2	2	1	34	70	79	36	11	22	3	82	122
Bentley	26	10	14	2	1	2	1	34	70	78	36	14	20	2	94	117
Holy Cross	26	10	14	2	3	0	0	29	56	72	37	12	23	2	77	108
Championship: March 19, 2022 † indicates conference regular season champion * indicates conference tournament champion (Riley Trophy); Rankings: USCHO.com Top 20 Poll

== Schedule and results ==
Date	Time	Opponent^{#}	Rank^{#}	Site	TV	Decision	Result	Attendance	Record
Exhibition
October 2	4:00 PM	at #7 Boston College*	#20	Conte Forum • Chestnut Hill, Massachusetts (Exhibition)		Calvaruso	L 1–4	567	—
Regular season
October 9	7:05 PM	#11 Providence*		MassMutual Center • Springfield, Massachusetts		Kucharski	L 1–5	577	0–1–0
October 15	7:05 PM	#9 Massachusetts*		MassMutual Center • Springfield, Massachusetts		Kucharski	L 1–5	1,306	0–2–0
October 16	7:00 PM	at #9 Massachusetts*		Mullins Center • Amherst, Massachusetts		Kucharski	L 2–4	4,664	0–3–0
October 21	7:05 PM	Army		MassMutual Center • Springfield, Massachusetts		Kucharski	W 4–3	195	1–3–0 (1–0–0)
October 22	7:05 PM	at Army		Tate Rink • West Point, New York		Kucharski	L 0–2	1,516	1–4–0 (1–1–0)
October 29	7:05 PM	#5 Quinnipiac*		MassMutual Center • Springfield, Massachusetts		Kucharski	T 2–2 ^{OT}	487	1–4–1
October 30	7:00 PM	at #5 Quinnipiac*		People's United Center • Hamden, Connecticut		Calvaruso	L 1–2 ^{OT}	3,426	1–5–1
November 6	5:05 PM	RIT		MassMutual Center • Springfield, Massachusetts		Kucharski	W 7–3	306	2–5–1 (2–1–0)
November 7	5:05 PM	RIT		MassMutual Center • Springfield, Massachusetts		Calvaruso	L 2–3 ^{OT}	180	2–6–1 (2–2–0)
November 12	7:00 PM	at #12 Providence*		Schneider Arena • Providence, Rhode Island		Kucharski	L 1–2 ^{OT}	1,753	2–7–1
November 19	1:05 PM	Bentley		MassMutual Center • Springfield, Massachusetts		Kucharski	W 5–0	293	3–7–1 (3–2–0)
November 20	1:05 PM	Bentley		MassMutual Center • Springfield, Massachusetts		Calvaruso	L 1–2 ^{OT}	192	3–8–1 (3–3–0)
November 26	1:00 PM	at Canisius		LECOM Harborcenter • Buffalo, New York		Kucharski	L 5–6	552	3–9–1 (3–4–0)
November 27	1:00 PM	at Canisius		LECOM Harborcenter • Buffalo, New York		Calvaruso	W 3–2	609	4–9–1 (4–4–0)
January 1	7:35 PM	Air Force		MassMutual Center • Springfield, Massachusetts		Kucharski	W 5–2	182	5–9–1 (5–4–0)
January 2	4:05 PM	Air Force		MassMutual Center • Springfield, Massachusetts		Kucharski	W 4–3	299	6–9–1 (6–4–0)
January 7	7:05 PM	at Holy Cross		Hart Center • Worcester, Massachusetts		Kucharski	W 2–0	0	7–9–1 (7–4–0)
January 8	5:05 PM	at Holy Cross		Hart Center • Worcester, Massachusetts		Calvaruso	W 5–2	0	8–9–1 (8–4–0)
January 11	7:05 PM	Connecticut*		MassMutual Center • Springfield, Massachusetts		Kucharski	W 3–1	207	9–9–1
January 14	1:05 PM	Mercyhurst		MassMutual Center • Springfield, Massachusetts		Kucharski	W 5–4	70	10–9–1 (9–4–0)
January 15	1:05 PM	Mercyhurst		MassMutual Center • Springfield, Massachusetts		Calvaruso	W 6–3	79	11–9–1 (10–4–0)
January 21	6:05 PM	at Sacred Heart		Webster Bank Arena • Bridgeport, Connecticut		Kucharski	W 4–2	243	12–9–1 (11–4–0)
January 22	1:05 PM	at Sacred Heart		Webster Bank Arena • Bridgeport, Connecticut		Calvaruso	W 3–1	253	13–9–1 (12–4–0)
January 27	5:05 PM	Holy Cross		MassMutual Center • Springfield, Massachusetts		Kucharski	W 3–1	191	14–9–1 (13–4–0)
January 30	12:05 PM	Holy Cross		MassMutual Center • Springfield, Massachusetts		McInchak	L 4–5	137	14–10–1 (13–5–0)
February 4	7:05 PM	at RIT		Gene Polisseni Center • Henrietta, New York		Calvaruso	W 7–0	1,786	15–10–1 (14–5–0)
February 5	7:05 PM	at RIT		Gene Polisseni Center • Henrietta, New York		Kucharski	T 4–4 ^{SOL}	2,200	15–10–2 (14–5–1)
February 10	5:05 PM	Army		MassMutual Center • Springfield, Massachusetts		Calvaruso	W 5–1	252	16–10–2 (15–5–1)
February 12	6:05 PM	at Army		Tate Rink • West Point, New York		Kucharski	L 0–1	1,589	16–11–2 (15–6–1)
February 18	7:05 PM	at Mercyhurst		Mercyhurst Ice Center • Erie, Pennsylvania		Kucharski	W 5–1	1,214	17–11–2 (16–6–1)
February 19	3:05 PM	at Mercyhurst		Mercyhurst Ice Center • Erie, Pennsylvania		Calvaruso	L 3–6	779	17–12–2 (16–7–1)
February 25	1:05 PM	Niagara		MassMutual Center • Springfield, Massachusetts		Kucharski	T 1–1 ^{SOL}	93	17–12–3 (16–7–2)
February 26	1:05 PM	Niagara		MassMutual Center • Springfield, Massachusetts		Kucharski	W 4–3 ^{OT}	262	18–12–3 (17–7–2)
Atlantic Hockey Tournament
March 11	7:00 PM	Bentley*		MassMutual Center • Springfield, Massachusetts (Quarterfinal game 1)		Calvaruso	W 5–2	410	19–12–3
March 12	7:00 PM	Bentley*		MassMutual Center • Springfield, Massachusetts (Quarterfinal game 2)		Calvaruso	W 6–2	310	20–12–3
American International Won Series 2–0
March 18	4:05 PM	vs. Mercyhurst*		Adirondack Bank Center • Utica, New York (Semifinal)		Calvaruso	W 5–4	1,072	21–12–3
March 19	7:35 PM	vs. Air Force*		Adirondack Bank Center • Utica, New York (Championship)		Calvaruso	W 7–0	250	22–12–3
NCAA Tournament
March 25	3:00 PM	vs. #2 Michigan*	#18	PPL Center • Allentown, Pennsylvania (Midwest Regional semifinal)	ESPNU	Calvaruso	L 3–5	2,155	22–13–3
*Non-conference game. ^{#}Rankings from USCHO.com Poll. All times are in Eastern Time. Source:

== Scoring statistics ==
Name	Position	Games	Goals	Assists	Points	PIM
Blake Bennett	F	37	19	15	34	20
Justin Young	C	36	12	19	31	16
Chris Dodero	C/LW	36	13	16	29	6
Chris Theodore	LW	35	10	19	29	6
Zak Galambos	D	36	5	24	29	49
Jake Stella	LW	37	12	16	28	12
Brian Rigali	F	32	13	13	26	8
Elijiah Barriga	LW	37	9	15	24	16
Luis Lindner	F/D	28	4	14	18	8
Chris Van Os-Shaw	LW	36	7	8	15	41
Julius Janhonen	C	33	6	8	14	4
Luka Maver	C	38	6	6	12	16
Brian Kramer	D	36	3	8	11	32
Justin Cole	F	32	1	10	11	4
Brett Callahan	D	25	2	6	8	10
Parker Revering	D	25	2	6	8	10
Austen Long	RW	24	3	4	7	12
Evan Stella	D	36	0	6	6	20
Hunter Johannes	F	14	3	2	5	4
Eric Otto	F	19	1	4	5	10
Nico Somerville	D	24	1	4	5	12
Santeri Hartikainen	C/RW	6	0	3	3	0
Aaron Grounds	F	15	1	1	2	4
Matthew Rickard	D	21	1	1	2	12
Zachary Purcell	F	1	0	0	0	0
Jarrett Fiske	G	1	0	0	0	0
Ryan McInchak	G	1	0	0	0	0
Alexander Tertyshny	RW	1	0	0	0	0
Michal Stinil	W	1	0	0	0	0
Reggie Millette	F	9	0	0	0	0
Darwin Lakoduk	F	10	0	0	0	0
Alec Calvaruso	G	16	0	0	0	0
Jake Kucharski	G	22	0	0	0	2
Bench	-	-	-	-	-	6
Total			134	228	362	355

== Goaltending statistics ==
Name	Games	Minutes	Wins	Losses	Ties	Goals against	Saves	Shut outs	SV %	GAA
Jarrett Fiske	1	2:09	0	0	0	0	3	0	1.000	0.00
Ryan McInchak	1	33	0	1	0	1	13	0	.929	1.81
Jake Kucharski	22	1334	12	7	3	53	535	2	.910	2.38
Alec Calvaruso	16	925	10	5	0	39	374	2	.906	2.53
Empty Net	-	23	-	-	-	2	-	-	-	-
Total	38	2318	22	13	3	95	925	4	.907	2.46

== Rankings ==
Poll	Week																									
Poll	Pre	1	2	3	4	5	6	7	8	9	10	11	12	13	14	15	16	17	18	19	20	21	22	23	24	25 (Final)
USCHO.com	20	NR	NR	NR	NR	NR	NR	NR	NR	NR	NR	NR	NR	NR	NR	NR	NR	NR	NR	NR	NR	NR	NR	18	-	18
USA Today	NR	NR	NR	NR	NR	NR	NR	NR	NR	NR	NR	NR	NR	NR	NR	NR	NR	NR	NR	NR	NR	NR	NR	NR	NR	NR

Note: USCHO did not release a poll in week 24.

== Awards and honors ==
Player	Award	Ref
Chris Theodore	Atlantic Hockey Player of the Year	
Jake Stella	Atlantic Hockey Best Defensive Forward	
Zak Galambos	Atlantic Hockey Best Defenseman	
Jake Kucharski	Atlantic Hockey Regular Season Goaltending Award	
Jake Kucharski	Atlantic Hockey Coach of the Year	
Blake Bennett	Atlantic Hockey Most Valuable Player in Tournament	
Zak Galambos	Atlantic Hockey First Team	
Chris Theodore	Atlantic Hockey First Team	
Jake Stella	Atlantic Hockey Second Team	
Jake Kucharski	Atlantic Hockey Third Team	
Luis Lindner	Atlantic Hockey Rookie Team	
Alec Calvaruso	Atlantic Hockey All-Tournament Team	
Zak Galambos	Atlantic Hockey All-Tournament Team	
Blake Bennett	Atlantic Hockey All-Tournament Team	
Chris Dodero	Atlantic Hockey All-Tournament Team	
