= 2021–22 Atlantic Hockey season =

- Season: 2021–22
- Conference: Atlantic Hockey
- Division: Division I
- Sport: ice hockey
- Duration: October 2, 2021– March 25, 2022
- Number of teams: 10

Regular season
- Season champions: American International
- Top scorer: Colin Bilek; Neil Shea

Atlantic Hockey Tournament
- Tournament champions: American International
- Runners-up: Air Force
- Tournament MVP: Blake Bennett
- Top scorer: Blake Bennett

NCAA tournament
- Bids: 1
- Record: 0–1
- Best Finish: Regional semifinal
- Team(s): American International

The 2021–22 Atlantic Hockey season was the 19th season of play for Atlantic Hockey and took place during the 2021–22 NCAA Division I men's ice hockey season. The regular season began on October 2, 2021, and concluded on February 26, 2022. The conference tournament began in March, 2022 and concluded with American International winning the conference championship.

== Realignment ==
On May 26, 2021, Robert Morris University announced that it would be ending both its men and women's varsity hockey programs effective immediately. Fundraising efforts to save both program began immediately. While more than $1 million was secured in less than 3 months, by mid-August the school decided that the donations were insufficient to guarantee the program for the 2021–22 season and the team would look to return for the 2022–23 campaign.

Due to the dissolution of the WCHA, Alabama–Huntsville submitted a bid to join Atlantic Hockey. The 10 existing conference members mulled over admitting UAH, Long Island (an Independent who had been in a scheduling alliance with Atlantic Hockey in 2021), and an unnamed third team that had expressed interest in joining the conference. The member teams ultimately decided against expansion for the 2021–22 season by a unanimous vote.

== Coaches ==
Bill Riga replaced David Berard as head coach for Holy Cross during the offseason.

Wayne Wilson enters the season needing 9 wins to reach 400 wins.

=== Records ===
Team	Head coach	Season at school	Record at school	Atlantic Hockey record
Air Force	Frank Serratore	25	410–378–93	211–129–64
American International	Eric Lang	6	82–73–14	68–43–13
Army	Brian Riley	18	204–300–82	167–212–76
Bentley	Ryan Soderquist	20	252–336–81	191–206–72
Canisius	Trevor Large	5	52–62–13	42–44–10
Holy Cross	Bill Riga	1	0–0–0	0–0–0
Mercyhurst	Rick Gotkin	34	572–459–96	234–186–56
Niagara	Jason Lammers	5	47–71–15	36–48–15
RIT	Wayne Wilson	23	391–274–73	216–136–49
Sacred Heart	C. J. Marottolo	13	142–237–45	115–164–38

== Standings ==
2021–22 Atlantic Hockey Standings
	Conference record										Overall record					
	GP	W	L	T	OW	OL	SW	PTS	GF	GA	GP	W	L	T	GF	GA
#18 American International †*	26	17	7	2	1	2	0	54	97	61	38	22	13	3	134	95
Canisius	26	13	11	2	2	1	1	43	76	67	35	16	16	3	99	97
Army	26	12	11	3	0	1	2	42	75	68	35	14	17	4	98	100
RIT	26	12	10	4	1	3	3	41	69	82	38	18	16	4	92	115
Sacred Heart	26	11	12	3	0	1	3	40	72	70	37	15	18	4	95	100
Air Force	26	11	12	3	3	2	2	37	76	80	36	16	17	3	99	127
Mercyhurst	26	10	12	4	0	1	1	36	75	79	39	16	19	4	114	129
Niagara	26	10	13	3	2	2	1	34	70	79	36	11	22	3	82	122
Bentley	26	10	14	2	1	2	1	34	70	78	36	14	20	2	94	117
Holy Cross	26	10	14	2	3	0	0	29	56	72	37	12	23	2	77	108
Championship: March 19, 2022 † indicates conference regular season champion * indicates conference tournament champion (Riley Trophy); Rankings: USCHO.com Top 20 Poll

== Non-Conference record ==
Of the sixteen teams that are selected to participate in the NCAA tournament, ten will be via at-large bids. Those 10 teams are determined based upon the PairWise rankings. The rankings take into account all games played but are heavily affected by intra-conference results. The result is that teams from leagues which perform better in non-conference are much more likely to receive at-large bids even if they possess inferior records overall.

As a whole, Atlantic Hockey had a poor record against other conferences. While two programs ended with even marks in the regular season, no league member had a winning record in non-conference play. On aggregate, Atlantic Hockey posted losing records against every conference with the exception of ECAC Hockey.

=== Regular season record ===
Team	Big Ten	CCHA	ECAC Hockey	Hockey East	Independent	NCHC	Total
Air Force	1–1–0	0–0–0	0–0–0	0–0–0	0–0–0	1–3–0	2–4–0
American International	0–0–0	0–0–0	0–1–1	1–4–0	0–0–0	0–0–0	1–5–1
Army	0–3–0	0–0–0	2–0–1	0–1–0	0–0–0	0–0–0	2–4–1
Bentley	1–1–0	0–0–0	0–1–0	1–2–0	0–0–0	0–0–0	2–4–0
Canisius	1–1–0	1–1–0	1–1–1	0–0–0	0–0–0	0–0–0	3–3–1
Holy Cross	0–2–0	0–0–0	1–1–0	1–4–0	0–0–0	0–0–0	2–7–0
Mercyhurst	1–3–0	0–0–0	0–0–0	0–2–0	0–0–0	1–0–0	2–5–0
Niagara	0–2–0	0–0–0	0–0–0	0–0–0	0–0–0	1–3–0	1–5–0
RIT Tigers	1–1–0	0–0–0	3–1–0	0–0–0	0–2–0	0–0–0	4–4–0
Sacred Heart	0–0–0	0–0–0	1–1–0	2–3–1	0–0–0	0–0–0	3–4–1
Overall	5–14–0	1–1–0	8–6–3	5–16–1	0–2–0	3–6–0	22–45–4

== Statistics ==
=== Leading scorers ===
GP = Games played; G = Goals; A = Assists; Pts = Points; PIM = Penalty minutes

Player	Class	Team	GP	G	A	Pts	PIM
Neil Shea	Junior	Sacred Heart	26	10	15	25	10
Colin Bilek	Senior	Army	26	7	18	25	20
Chris Theodore	Senior	American International	24	7	17	24	6
Jake Stella	Junior	American International	25	9	14	23	10
Justin Young	Graduate	American International	25	10	13	23	12
Ryan Naumovski	Junior	Niagara	26	6	16	22	2
Carson Brière	Sophomore	Mercyhurst	24	9	13	22	20
Will Calverley	Senior	RIT	26	12	10	22	8
Carter Wilkie	Freshman	RIT	26	9	13	22	27
Matt Gosiewski	Junior	Bentley	26	7	15	22	4

=== Leading goaltenders ===
Minimum 1/3 of team's minutes played in conference games.
GP = Games played; Min = Minutes played; GA = Goals against; SO = Shutouts; SV% = Save percentage; GAA = Goals against average

Player	Class	Team	GP	Min	GA	SO	SV%	GAA
Jake Kucharski	Sophomore	American International	16	965:54	35	2	.915	2.17
Jacob Barczewski	Junior	Canisius	23	1294:17	52	1	.924	2.41
Gavin Abric	Freshman	Army	23	1312:50	53	4	.927	2.42
Justin Robbins	Junior	Sacred Heart	20	1009:00	41	0	.904	2.44
Matt Radomsky	Junior	Holy Cross	19	1128:14	46	1	.909	2.45

== Conference tournament ==
Teams are reseeded for the semifinals

First round March 4–6
7	Mercyhurst	2*	2	–
10	Holy Cross	1	1	–
8	Niagara	2	1	–
9	Bentley	3*	4	–

Quarterfinals; March 11–13
1	American International	5	6	–
9	Bentley	2	2	–
2	Canisius	1	1	–
7	Mercyhurst	2**	3	–
3	Army	4	2	–
6	Air Force	5*	3*	–
4	RIT	1*	1	3
5	Sacred Heart	0	3	1

Semifinals; March 18
1	American International	5
7	Mercyhurst	4
4	RIT	3
6	Air Force	4

Championship; March 19
1	American International	7
6	Air Force	0

Note: * denotes overtime period(s)

== NCAA tournament ==
=== Midwest Regional semifinal ===
March 25, 2022; 3:00 PM	(1) Michigan	5 – 3 (2–1, 3–1, 0–1)	(4) American International	PPL Center; Attendance: 2,155

Game reference

Erik Portillo
Goalies
Alec Calvaruso
Referees:
Cameron Lynch
Brad LeBlanc
Linesmen:
Patrick Dapuzzo
Steve Drain

(Hughes, Moyle) Garrett Van Wyhe (5) – 03:37	1–0
(Brisson, Beniers) Ethan Edwards (3) – 04:16	2–0
	2–1	12:32 – Brian Rigali (13) (Bennett, Galambos)
(Power, Johnson) Brendan Brisson (20) – PP – 20:43	3–1
(Brisson, Johnson) Matty Beniers (20) – GW – 22:43	4–1
	4–2	26:15 – Justin Young (12) (Theodore)
(Power, Samoskevich) Dylan Duke (10) – 26:43	5–2
	5–3	53:48 – PP – Blake Bennett (19) (Barriga, Young)

8 min
Penalties
6 min
31
Shots
32

Game summary
Heavy favorite, Michigan, lived up to their billing early when the Wolverines scored twice in the first five minutes of the game. Alec Calvaruso held the fort and stopped the tournament's top seed from extending their lead afterwards. Past the mid-way point of the period, AIC finally got a bounce their way when Blake Bennett tried to center the puck. It deflected up into the air, hit Luke Hughes in the back and then rolled past a sprawling Erik Portillo.

A penalty taken by AIC at the end of the first period resulted in a Michigan power play goal less than a minute into the second. A quick passing play a few minutes later put Michigan ahead by 3 and the Wolverines looked to be just too much for the Yellow Jackets. A few minutes later, however, AIC scored their second goal of the game after a turnover at the Michigan blueline. The Wolverines responded the very next shift when Dylan Duke potted his team's 5th goal, however, the play was reviewed for offsides. While a Michigan player had entered the zone before the puck, it was unclear whether or not an AIC player had shot the puck into the zone. While it appeared that Michigan had caused the puck to cross the blueline, the video was ruled inconclusive and the goal was allowed to stand. AIC continued to play hard, forcing Michigan to take consecutive penalties in the middle of the period, but weren't able to capitalize on their opportunities.

Michigan tried to play a sleepy third period and bleed away the clock but AIC kept playing hard. After Garrett Van Wyhe took an inadvisable holding penalty in the middle of the period, Bennett found himself alone in front of the net and slid the puck around Portillo. Near the end of the game, after the Yellow Jackets pulled their goaltender, Nick Blankenburg cross-checked Elijiah Barriga into the board from behind. There was some concern that the Michigan captain might receive a suspension for the hit and miss the team's next game.

== Ranking ==
=== USCHO ===
Team	Pre	1	2	3	4	5	6	7	8	9	10	11	12	13	14	15	16	17	18	19	20	21	22	23	Final
Air Force	NR	NR	NR	NR	NR	NR	NR	NR	NR	NR	NR	NR	NR	NR	NR	NR	NR	NR	NR	NR	NR	NR	NR	NR	NR
American International	20	NR	NR	NR	NR	NR	NR	NR	NR	NR	NR	NR	NR	NR	NR	NR	NR	NR	NR	NR	NR	NR	NR	18	18
Army	NR	NR	NR	NR	NR	NR	NR	NR	NR	NR	NR	NR	NR	NR	NR	NR	NR	NR	NR	NR	NR	NR	NR	NR	NR
Bentley	NR	NR	NR	NR	NR	NR	NR	NR	NR	NR	NR	NR	NR	NR	NR	NR	NR	NR	NR	NR	NR	NR	NR	NR	NR
Canisius	NR	NR	NR	NR	NR	NR	NR	NR	NR	NR	NR	NR	NR	NR	NR	NR	NR	NR	NR	NR	NR	NR	NR	NR	NR
Holy Cross	NR	NR	NR	NR	NR	NR	NR	NR	NR	NR	NR	NR	NR	NR	NR	NR	NR	NR	NR	NR	NR	NR	NR	NR	NR
Mercyhurst	NR	NR	NR	NR	NR	NR	NR	NR	NR	NR	NR	NR	NR	NR	NR	NR	NR	NR	NR	NR	NR	NR	NR	NR	NR
Niagara	NR	NR	NR	NR	NR	NR	NR	NR	NR	NR	NR	NR	NR	NR	NR	NR	NR	NR	NR	NR	NR	NR	NR	NR	NR
RIT	NR	NR	NR	NR	NR	NR	NR	NR	NR	NR	NR	NR	NR	NR	NR	NR	NR	NR	NR	NR	NR	NR	NR	NR	NR
Sacred Heart	NR	NR	NR	NR	NR	NR	NR	NR	NR	NR	NR	NR	NR	NR	NR	NR	NR	NR	NR	NR	NR	NR	NR	NR	NR

USCHO did not release a poll in week 24.

=== USA Today ===
Team	Pre	1	2	3	4	5	6	7	8	9	10	11	12	13	14	15	16	17	18	19	20	21	22	23	24	Final
Air Force	NR	NR	NR	NR	NR	NR	NR	NR	NR	NR	NR	NR	NR	NR	NR	NR	NR	NR	NR	NR	NR	NR	NR	NR	NR	NR
American International	NR	NR	NR	NR	NR	NR	NR	NR	NR	NR	NR	NR	NR	NR	NR	NR	NR	NR	NR	NR	NR	NR	NR	NR	NR	NR
Army	NR	NR	NR	NR	NR	NR	NR	NR	NR	NR	NR	NR	NR	NR	NR	NR	NR	NR	NR	NR	NR	NR	NR	NR	NR	NR
Bentley	NR	NR	NR	NR	NR	NR	NR	NR	NR	NR	NR	NR	NR	NR	NR	NR	NR	NR	NR	NR	NR	NR	NR	NR	NR	NR
Canisius	NR	NR	NR	NR	NR	NR	NR	NR	NR	NR	NR	NR	NR	NR	NR	NR	NR	NR	NR	NR	NR	NR	NR	NR	NR	NR
Holy Cross	NR	NR	NR	NR	NR	NR	NR	NR	NR	NR	NR	NR	NR	NR	NR	NR	NR	NR	NR	NR	NR	NR	NR	NR	NR	NR
Mercyhurst	NR	NR	NR	NR	NR	NR	NR	NR	NR	NR	NR	NR	NR	NR	NR	NR	NR	NR	NR	NR	NR	NR	NR	NR	NR	NR
Niagara	NR	NR	NR	NR	NR	NR	NR	NR	NR	NR	NR	NR	NR	NR	NR	NR	NR	NR	NR	NR	NR	NR	NR	NR	NR	NR
RIT	NR	NR	NR	NR	NR	NR	NR	NR	NR	NR	NR	NR	NR	NR	NR	NR	NR	NR	NR	NR	NR	NR	NR	NR	NR	NR
Sacred Heart	NR	NR	NR	NR	NR	NR	NR	NR	NR	NR	NR	NR	NR	NR	NR	NR	NR	NR	NR	NR	NR	NR	NR	NR	NR	NR

=== Pairwise ===
Team	1	2	3	4	5	6	7	8	9	10	11	12	13	14	15	16	17	18	19	20	21	22	Final
Air Force	14	46	28	41	49	53	51	51	58	53	51	52	52	49	44	47	48	51	46	49	48	45	43
American International	14	12	50	53	43	39	37	34	31	30	30	27	25	20	18	21	19	21	21	23	24	22	20
Army	14	24	44	47	46	44	48	41	44	43	35	39	39	40	43	41	41	39	37	40	40	42	42
Bentley	14	39	20	33	36	32	38	38	36	28	31	32	35	37	33	34	40	43	44	44	42	45	43
Canisius	14	16	35	32	33	32	29	31	30	31	34	34	36	36	37	36	35	37	31	36	37	39	39
Holy Cross	14	22	45	43	47	51	57	58	52	52	53	53	54	53	54	52	53	52	55	51	53	51	51
Mercyhurst	14	49	37	38	37	46	49	47	38	43	45	49	47	47	51	51	51	48	45	44	41	39	39
Niagara	14	49	53	52	52	52	50	52	51	51	50	48	49	52	50	50	46	46	47	44	50	50	50
RIT	14	18	33	34	34	38	45	37	33	32	43	44	43	42	40	39	37	39	39	38	39	38	38
Sacred Heart	14	35	34	31	35	42	46	44	35	38	36	35	32	38	36	37	37	34	37	34	35	35	35

Note: teams ranked in the top-10 automatically qualify for the NCAA tournament. Teams ranked 11-16 can qualify based upon conference tournament results.

== Awards ==
=== Atlantic Hockey ===
Award		Recipient
Player of the Year		Chris Theodore, American International
Rookie of the Year		Carter Wilkie, RIT
Best Defensive Forward		Jake Stella, American International
Best Defenseman		Zak Galambos, American International
Individual Sportsmanship Award		Daniel Haider, Army
Regular season Scoring Trophy		Colin Bilek, Army
Regular season Scoring Trophy		Neil Shea, Sacred Heart
Regular season Goaltending Award		Jake Kucharski, American International
Coach of the Year		Eric Lang, American International
All-Atlantic Hockey Teams
First Team	Position	Second Team
Jacob Barczewski, Canisius	G	Gavin Abric, Army
Zak Galambos, American International	D	Anthony Firriolo, Army
Drew Bavaro, Bentley	D	Logan Britt, Sacred Heart
Chris Theodore, American International	F	Keaton Mastrodonato, Canisius
Colin Bilek, Army	F	Neil Shea, Sacred Heart
Will Calverley, RIT	F	Jake Stella, American International
Third Team	Position	Rookie Team
Jake Kucharski, American International	G	Tommy Scarfone, RIT
Brandon Koch, Air Force	D	Luis Lindner, American International
David Melaragni, Canisius	D	Mitchell Digby, Air Force
Braeden Tuck, Sacred Heart	F	Carter Wilkie, RIT
Carson Brière, Mercyhurst	F	Clayton Cosentino, Air Force
Ryan Leibold, Holy Cross	F	Shane Ott, Niagara

==== Conference tournament ====
Tournament MVP
Blake Bennett		American International
All-Tournament Team
Player	Pos	Team
Alec Calvaruso	G	American International
Brandon Koch	D	Air Force
Zak Galambos	D	American International
Blake Bennett	F	American International
Chris Dodero	F	American International
Will Gavin	F	Air Force
