= 2021–22 Canisius Golden Griffins men's ice hockey season =

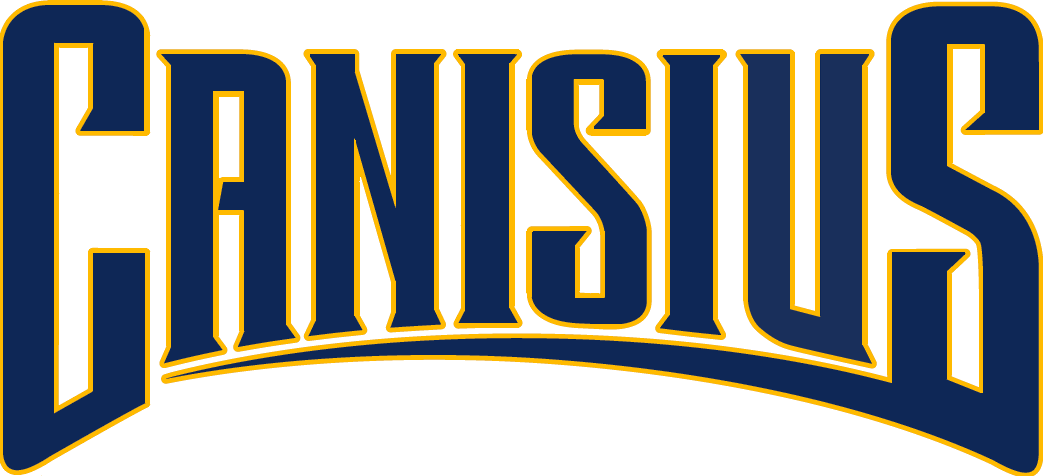
- Conference: 2nd Atlantic Hockey
- Home ice: LECOM Harborcenter

Rankings
- USCHO: NR
- USA Today: NR

Record
- Overall: 16–16–3
- Conference: 13–11–2
- Home: 9–9–0
- Road: 7–7–3

Coaches and captains
- Head coach: Trevor Large
- Assistant coaches: Daniel Paille; Max Mobley
- Captain: J. D. Pogue
- Alternate captain(s): Austin Alger; Keaton Mastrodonato; David Melaragni

The 2021–22 Canisius Golden Griffins men's ice hockey season was the 42nd season of play for the program, the 24th at the Division I level, and the 19th season in the Atlantic Hockey conference. The Golden Griffins represented Canisius College and were coached by Trevor Large, in his 5th season.

== Season ==
Canisius got off to a good start, winning games against three non-conference opponents and tying Clarkson, who finished the season in the top-20. Despite showing promise early, the Golden Griffins played inconsistently once their conference schedule began. While they led the Atlantic Hockey standings early, the team could only complete two weekend sweeps all season.

Canisius received very capable goaltending from Jacob Barczewski but their offense was hit-or-miss. The Golden Griffins were limited to less than 3 goals in 18 games during the season with their leading goal-scorer, Max Kouznetsov, hitting just 12 for the year. In spite of their occasional offensive struggles, Canisius benefitted from Atlantic Hockey being a mediocre conference and finished in second place.

The Golden Griffins opened their postseason run with a home date against Mercyhurst but their offense failed them at the worst time. Canisius fired 63 shots on goal in two games but could only get a single marker in each contest. They lost the series, including a double overtime match in game 1, and would have to wait for another year.

== Departures ==
Player	Position	Nationality	Cause
David Baskerville	Forward	United States	Graduation (retired)
Logan Gestro	Defenseman	United States	Graduation (retired)
Matt Long	Forward	United States	Graduation (retired)
Grant Meyer	Forward	United States	Graduation (retired)
Kevin Obssuth	Forward	United States	Transferred to Wentworth
MacGregor Sinclair	Forward	Canada	Transferred to Wisconsin–Superior
John Stampohar	Defenseman	United States	Transferred to Wisconsin–Superior
Jami Virtanen	Forward	Finland	Signed professional contract (Ässät)
Blake Wareham	Defenseman	United States	Graduation (signed with Danbury Hat Tricks)
Tucker Weppner	Goaltender	United States	Graduation (retired)

== Recruiting ==
Player	Position	Nationality	Age	Notes
Alex Ambrosio	Forward	Canada	24	Burnaby, BC; graduate transfer from Lake Superior State
Danny DiGrande	Forward	United States	24	Macomb, MI; transfer from Rensselaer
John Hawthorne	Goaltender	Canada	19	Chemainus, BC; transfer from Northern Michigan
Randy Hernández	Forward	United States	22	Miami, FL; transfer from Robert Morris
Alexander Houston	Goaltender	United States	19	Canton, OH; joined mid-season
Keegan Langefels	Defenseman	United States	21	Eden Prairie, MN
Joey Matthews	Defenseman	United States	24	Columbia, IL; graduate transfer from Dartmouth
Alton McDermott	Forward	Canada	20	Oakville, ON
Cory Thomas	Defenseman	United States	23	St. Brieux, SK; graduate transfer from Vermont
Matthew Vermaeten	Forward	United States	20	Ottawa, ON
Jake Witkowski	Forward	United States	24	Melrose, MA; graduate transfer from Boston University

== Roster ==
As of August 23, 2021.

No.	Nat.	Player	Class	Pos	Height	Weight	DoB	Hometown	Previous team	NHL rights
4	(United States)	Keegan Langefels	Freshman	D	6' 0" (1.83 m)	185 lb (84 kg)	2001-02-02	Eden Prairie, Minnesota	New Mexico Ice Wolves (NAHL)	—
5	(United States)	David Melaragni (A)	Junior	D	6' 0" (1.83 m)	180 lb (82 kg)	1998-03-30	Philadelphia, Pennsylvania	Cowichan Valley Capitals (BCHL)	—
8	(Canada)	Keaton Mastrodonato (A)	Junior	F	6' 0" (1.83 m)	205 lb (93 kg)	2000-09-24	Powell River, British Columbia	Alberni Valley Bulldogs (BCHL)	—
9	(Canada)	J. D. Pogue (C)	Senior	F	6' 1" (1.85 m)	195 lb (88 kg)	1997-06-23	Montreal, Quebec	Cornwall Colts (CCHL)	—
10	(United States)	Nick Parody	Junior	D	6' 3" (1.91 m)	195 lb (88 kg)	1998-01-02	Harrisburg, Pennsylvania	Islanders Hockey Club (NCDC)	—
12	(United States)	Jake Witkowski	Graduate	F	5' 10" (1.78 m)	180 lb (82 kg)	1996-08-26	Melrose, Massachusetts	Boston University (HEA)	—
14	(United States)	Daniel DiGrande	Junior	F	5' 10" (1.78 m)	180 lb (82 kg)	1997-08-05	Macomb, Michigan	RPI (ECAC)	—
15	(United States)	Joey Matthews	Graduate	D	5' 10" (1.78 m)	180 lb (82 kg)	1997-06-24	Columbia, Illinois	Dartmouth (ECAC)	—
20	(United States)	Randy Hernandez	Sophomore	F	6' 0" (1.83 m)	190 lb (86 kg)	1999-01-12	Miami, Florida	Robert Morris (AHA)	—
23	(United States)	Cooper Haar	Sophomore	F	6' 3" (1.91 m)	205 lb (93 kg)	1999-04-26	Huntington Beach, California	Aberdeen Wings (NAHL)	—
24	(United States)	Jackson Decker	Sophomore	D	5' 11" (1.8 m)	170 lb (77 kg)	1999-03-19	Algonquin, Illinois	Chippewa Steel (NAHL)	—
25	(Canada)	Matthew Vermaeten	Freshman	F	5' 10" (1.78 m)	165 lb (75 kg)	2001-01-04	Ottawa, Ontario	Shreveport Mudbugs (NAHL)	—
27	(Canada)	Ryan Miotto	Junior	F	6' 0" (1.83 m)	185 lb (84 kg)	1999-07-11	Thorold, Ontario	Alberni Valley Bulldogs (BCHL)	—
28	(Canada)	Lee Lapid	Senior	F	6' 0" (1.83 m)	190 lb (86 kg)	1998-01-11	Thornhill, Ontario	Toronto Patriots (OJHL)	—
29	(Canada)	John Hawthorne	Junior	G	6' 2" (1.88 m)	190 lb (86 kg)	1998-09-02	Chemainus, British Columbia	Northern Michigan (WCHA)	—
30	(United States)	Jacob Barczewski	Junior	G	6' 1" (1.85 m)	175 lb (79 kg)	1999-01-07	O'Fallon, Missouri	Tri-City Storm (USHL)	—
33	(United States)	Matt Ladd	Senior	G	6' 3" (1.91 m)	200 lb (91 kg)	1998-07-11	Getzville, New York	New Jersey Titans (NAHL)	—
37	(Canada)	Cory Thomas	Graduate	D	6' 5" (1.96 m)	215 lb (98 kg)	1998-03-19	St. Brieux, Saskatchewan	Vermont (HEA)	—
40	(Sweden)	Niclas Puikkonen	Sophomore	F	6' 1" (1.85 m)	198 lb (90 kg)	1999-01-23	Stockholm, Sweden	Amarillo Bulls (NAHL)	—
44	(United States)	Connor Zilisch	Sophomore	F	6' 1" (1.85 m)	212 lb (96 kg)	1999-08-07	Appleton, Wisconsin	Topeka Pilots (NAHL)	—
53	(United States)	Lincoln Erne	Junior	D	6' 0" (1.83 m)	200 lb (91 kg)	1998-09-26	Blaine, Minnesota	Minot Minotauros (NAHL)	—
58	(Canada)	Derek Hamelin	Senior	D	5' 11" (1.8 m)	170 lb (77 kg)	1997-01-21	Mercier, Quebec	Langley Rivermen (BCHL)	—
71	(Canada)	Alex Ambrosio	Graduate	F	5' 10" (1.78 m)	175 lb (79 kg)	1997-03-12	Burnaby, British Columbia	Lake Superior State (WCHA)	—
72	(United States)	Max Kouznetsov	Sophomore	F	5' 11" (1.8 m)	175 lb (79 kg)	2000-12-06	Voorhees, New Jersey	Johnstown Tomahawks (NAHL)	—
77	(Canada)	Jack Lyons	Sophomore	D	6' 1" (1.85 m)	205 lb (93 kg)	1999-07-04	Mississauga, Ontario	Oakville Blades (OJHL)	—
81	(Canada)	Mitchell Martan	Senior	F	5' 8" (1.73 m)	180 lb (82 kg)	1998-06-30	Whitby, Ontario	Wellington Dukes (OJHL)	—
83	(United States)	Austin Alger (A)	Graduate	F	6' 0" (1.83 m)	170 lb (77 kg)	1997-09-23	Livonia, Michigan	Miami (NCHC)	—
85	(United States)	Alex Houston	Freshman	G	6' 2" (1.88 m)	190 lb (86 kg)	2002-03-21	Canton, Ohio	Cornwall Colts (CCHL)	—
89	(Canada)	Simon Gravel	Junior	F	5' 10" (1.78 m)	185 lb (84 kg)	1999-04-10	Boucherville, Quebec	Brooks Bandits (AJHL)	—
91	(Canada)	Alton McDermott	Freshman	F	5' 10" (1.78 m)	170 lb (77 kg)	2001-06-04	Oakville, Ontario	Oakville Blades (OJHL)	—
94	(Canada)	Hudson Lambert	Junior	D	6' 0" (1.83 m)	190 lb (86 kg)	1998-08-17	Richmond Hill, Ontario	Brampton Admirals (OJHL)	—

== Standings ==
2021–22 Atlantic Hockey Standings
	Conference record										Overall record					
	GP	W	L	T	OW	OL	SW	PTS	GF	GA	GP	W	L	T	GF	GA
#18 American International †*	26	17	7	2	1	2	0	54	97	61	38	22	13	3	134	95
Canisius	26	13	11	2	2	1	1	43	76	67	35	16	16	3	99	97
Army	26	12	11	3	0	1	2	42	75	68	35	14	17	4	98	100
RIT	26	12	10	4	1	3	3	41	69	82	38	18	16	4	92	115
Sacred Heart	26	11	12	3	0	1	3	40	72	70	37	15	18	4	95	100
Air Force	26	11	12	3	3	2	2	37	76	80	36	16	17	3	99	127
Mercyhurst	26	10	12	4	0	1	1	36	75	79	39	16	19	4	114	129
Niagara	26	10	13	3	2	2	1	34	70	79	36	11	22	3	82	122
Bentley	26	10	14	2	1	2	1	34	70	78	36	14	20	2	94	117
Holy Cross	26	10	14	2	3	0	0	29	56	72	37	12	23	2	77	108
Championship: March 19, 2022 † indicates conference regular season champion * indicates conference tournament champion (Riley Trophy); Rankings: USCHO.com Top 20 Poll

== Schedule and results ==
Date	Time	Opponent^{#}	Rank^{#}	Site	TV	Decision	Result	Attendance	Record
Regular Season
October 8	7:00 PM	at Penn State*		Pegula Ice Arena • University Park, Pennsylvania		Barczewski	W 4–1	5,996	1–0–0
October 9	1:00 PM	at Penn State*		Pegula Ice Arena • University Park, Pennsylvania		Ladd	L 2–5	6,020	1–1–0
October 15	7:00 PM	at Rensselaer*		Houston Field House • Troy, New York		Barczewski	L 3–7	370	1–2–0
October 16	7:00 PM	at Rensselaer*		Houston Field House • Troy, New York		Barczewski	W 3–2 ^{OT}	304	2–2–0
October 19	7:00 PM	at Clarkson*		Cheel Arena • Potsdam, New York		Hawthorne	T 4–4 ^{OT}	2,030	2–2–1
October 29	7:00 PM	Ferris State*		LECOM Harborcenter • Buffalo, New York		Barczewski	W 6–4	569	3–2–1
October 30	7:00 PM	Ferris State*		LECOM Harborcenter • Buffalo, New York		Barczewski	L 2–4	523	3–3–1
November 5	7:05 PM	at Bentley		Bentley Arena • Waltham, Massachusetts		Barczewski	L 1–2	1,262	3–4–1 (0–1–0)
November 6	4:05 PM	at Bentley		Bentley Arena • Waltham, Massachusetts		Barczewski	W 6–3	1,253	4–4–1 (1–1–0)
November 12	7:05 PM	RIT		LECOM Harborcenter • Buffalo, New York		Barczewski	W 5–2	537	5–4–1 (2–1–0)
November 13	7:05 PM	RIT		LECOM Harborcenter • Buffalo, New York		Barczewski	W 4–1	582	6–4–1 (3–1–0)
November 19	7:05 PM	at Mercyhurst		Mercyhurst Ice Center • Erie, Pennsylvania		Barczewski	W 6–1	747	7–4–1 (4–1–0)
November 20	7:00 PM	Mercyhurst		LECOM Harborcenter • Buffalo, New York		Barczewski	L 2–5	502	7–5–1 (4–2–0)
November 26	1:00 PM	American International		LECOM Harborcenter • Buffalo, New York		Barczewski	W 6–5	552	8–5–1 (5–2–0)
November 27	1:00 PM	American International		LECOM Harborcenter • Buffalo, New York		Barczewski	L 2–3	609	8–6–1 (5–3–0)
December 3	9:05 PM	at Air Force		Cadet Ice Arena • Colorado Springs, Colorado		Barczewski	L 2–5	1,652	8–7–1 (5–4–0)
December 4	7:05 PM	at Air Force		Cadet Ice Arena • Colorado Springs, Colorado		Hawthorne	T 3–3	1,565	8–7–2 (5–4–1)
December 10	7:00 PM	at Niagara		Dwyer Arena • Lewiston, New York		Barczewski	W 4–0	1,072	9–7–2 (6–4–1)
December 11	7:00 PM	Niagara		LECOM Harborcenter • Buffalo, New York		Hawthorne	L 2–3 ^{OT}	852	9–8–2 (6–5–1)
January 7	7:05 PM	at Army		Tate Rink • West Point, New York		Barczewski	W 5–3	1,283	10–8–2 (7–5–1)
January 8	4:05 PM	at Army		Tate Rink • West Point, New York		Barczewski	L 0–3	1,484	10–9–2 (7–6–1)
January 14	7:05 PM	at Holy Cross		Hart Center • Worcester, Massachusetts		Barczewski	T 1–1 ^{SOW}	77	10–9–3 (7–6–2)
January 15	7:05 PM	at Holy Cross		Hart Center • Worcester, Massachusetts		Barczewski	W 2–1	89	11–9–3 (8–6–2)
January 21	7:00 PM	Bentley		LECOM Harborcenter • Buffalo, New York		Barczewski	L 4–7	582	11–10–3 (8–7–2)
January 22	7:00 PM	Bentley		LECOM Harborcenter • Buffalo, New York		Barczewski	W 2–1 ^{OT}	614	12–10–3 (9–7–2)
February 4	7:00 PM	Air Force		LECOM Harborcenter • Buffalo, New York		Barczewski	W 4–2	523	13–10–3 (10–7–2)
February 5	7:00 PM	Air Force		LECOM Harborcenter • Buffalo, New York		Barczewski	L 2–3 ^{OT}	424	13–11–3 (10–8–2)
February 11	7:00 PM	Niagara		LECOM Harborcenter • Buffalo, New York		Barczewski	L 1–4	895	13–12–3 (10–9–2)
February 12	7:00 PM	at Niagara		Dwyer Arena • Lewiston, New York		Hawthorne	W 5–1	854	14–12–3 (11–9–2)
February 18	7:00 PM	Sacred Heart		LECOM Harborcenter • Buffalo, New York		Hawthorne	W 3–1	585	15–12–3 (12–9–2)
February 19	7:00 PM	Sacred Heart		LECOM Harborcenter • Buffalo, New York		Barczewski	W 3–1	803	16–12–3 (13–9–2)
February 25	7:00 PM	Mercyhurst		LECOM Harborcenter • Buffalo, New York		Barczewski	L 0–3	732	16–13–3 (13–10–2)
February 26	7:05 PM	at Mercyhurst		Mercyhurst Ice Center • Erie, Pennsylvania		Barczewski	L 1–3	858	16–14–3 (13–11–2)
Atlantic Hockey Tournament
March 11	7:00 PM	Mercyhurst*		LECOM Harborcenter • Buffalo, New York (Quarterfinal game 1)		Barczewski	L 1–2 ^{2OT}	513	16–15–3
March 12	7:00 PM	Mercyhurst*		LECOM Harborcenter • Buffalo, New York (Quarterfinal game 2)		Barczewski	L 1–3	443	16–16–3
Canisius Lost Series 0–2
*Non-conference game. ^{#}Rankings from USCHO.com Poll. All times are in Eastern Time. Source:

== Scoring statistics ==
Name	Position	Games	Goals	Assists	Points	PIM
Keaton Mastrodonato	C	30	11	15	26	20
Max Kouznetsov	C/LW	32	12	11	23	20
Lee Lapid	C	33	11	12	23	29
Mitchell Martan	LW	31	5	17	22	31
Austin Alger	F	33	11	10	21	18
Alex Ambrosio	F	35	7	11	18	24
Jackson Decker	D	35	3	13	16	28
David Melaragni	D	35	2	14	16	41
Ryan Miotto	F	32	7	7	14	12
Jake Witkowski	F	32	5	6	11	14
Danny DiGrande	C	30	6	4	10	42
Joey Matthews	D	28	2	7	9	6
J. D. Pogue	LW	17	4	4	8	12
Simon Gravel	C/RW	31	3	5	8	4
Cooper Haar	LW	21	2	6	8	6
Lincoln Erne	D	32	0	5	5	48
Randy Hernández	RW	10	2	2	4	2
Hudson Lambert	D	24	1	3	4	12
Derek Hamelin	D	24	0	4	4	8
Cory Thomas	D	34	2	1	3	39
Alton McDermott	RW	25	1	2	3	4
Keegan Langefels	D	13	0	3	3	0
Niclas Puikkonen	C/W	15	1	1	2	6
Connor Zilisch	F	8	1	0	1	2
Jacob Barczewski	G	29	0	1	1	2
Matt Ladd	G	1	0	0	0	0
Jake Zurat	G	1	0	0	0	0
Nick Parody	D	4	0	0	0	0
Jack Lyons	D	8	0	0	0	17
John Hawthorne	G	10	0	0	0	0
Matthew Vermaeten	F	10	0	0	0	15
Total			99	164	263	464

== Goaltending statistics ==
Name	Games	Minutes	Wins	Losses	Ties	Goals against	Saves	Shut outs	SV %	GAA
John Hawthorne	11	388	3	1	2	15	217	0	.935	2.32
Jacob Barczewski	29	1688	13	14	1	68	814	1	.923	2.42
Matt Ladd	1	59	0	1	0	4	39	0	.907	4.05
Empty Net	-	16	-	-	-	10	-	-	-	-
Total	35	2136	16	16	3	97	1070	1	.917	2.70

== Rankings ==
Poll	Week																									
Poll	Pre	1	2	3	4	5	6	7	8	9	10	11	12	13	14	15	16	17	18	19	20	21	22	23	24	25 (Final)
USCHO.com	NR	NR	NR	NR	NR	NR	NR	NR	NR	NR	NR	NR	NR	NR	NR	NR	NR	NR	NR	NR	NR	NR	NR	NR	-	NR
USA Today	NR	NR	NR	NR	NR	NR	NR	NR	NR	NR	NR	NR	NR	NR	NR	NR	NR	NR	NR	NR	NR	NR	NR	NR	NR	NR

Note: USCHO did not release a poll in week 24.

== Awards and honors ==
Player	Award	Ref
Jacob Barczewski	Atlantic Hockey First Team	
Keaton Mastrodonato	Atlantic Hockey Second Team	
David Melaragni	Atlantic Hockey Third Team	
