= 2021–22 Army Black Knights men's ice hockey season =

- Conference: 3rd Atlantic Hockey
- Home ice: Tate Rink

Rankings
- USCHO: NR
- USA Today: NR

Record
- Overall: 14–17–4
- Conference: 12–11–3
- Home: 8–7–3
- Road: 6–10–1

Coaches and captains
- Head coach: Brian Riley
- Assistant coaches: Zach McKelvie; Arlen Marshall
- Captain(s): Colin Bilek; Eric Butte
- Alternate captain(s): Thomas Farrell; Daniel Haider

The 2021–22 Army Black Knights men's ice hockey season was the 119th season of play for the program, the 112th at the Division I level, and the 19th season in the Atlantic Hockey conference. The Black Knights represented the United States Military Academy and were coached by Brian Riley, in his 18th season.

== Season ==
Army began the season with junior Justin Evenson as the team's starting goaltender. After two poor performance, however, Gavin Abric was given a turn in the net and the results improved. Despite in uptick in the goaltending, however, Army's offense suffered early in the year and the Black Knights went winless in their first six games. The team picked up their game in late October and managed to climb their way back to a .500 record by the winter break with senior All-American Colin Bilek leading the way.

An uptick in COVID-19 positives in January didn't affect Army too badly, however, it caused the cancellation of their annual meeting with the Royal Military College Paladins for the second straight season.

In the second half of the season, Army wasn't able to play very consistently and ended up losing slightly more than they won. Fortunately for the Black Knights, Atlantic Hockey was a sea of mediocrity that year and Army managed to finish third in the conference standings despite being just 1 game above .500.

Army played host to Air Force in the conference quarterfinals but the Black Knights' defense faltered. Army allowed their rival to fire 86 shots on goal in the two games and surrendered overtime goals in both.

== Departures ==
Player	Position	Nationality	Cause
Matthew Berkovitz	Defenseman	United States	Graduation (retired)
Tucker DeYoung	Forward	United States	Graduation (retired)
Kevin Dineen	Forward	United States	Graduation (retired)
Cody Fleckenstein	Defenseman	United States	Graduation (retired)
Trevin Kozlowski	Goaltender	United States	Graduation (signed with Iowa Wild)
Mason Krueger	Forward	United States	Graduation (signed with Quad City Storm)
John Laurito	Forward	United States	Graduation (retired)
John Zimmerman	Defenseman	United States	Graduation (signed with Quad City Storm)

== Recruiting ==
Player	Position	Nationality	Age	Notes
Joey Baez	Forward	United States	21	Tampa, FL
Josh Bohlin	Forward	United States	21	Wausau, WI
Andrew Garby	Defenseman	United States	21	Canton, MI
Andrew Gilbert	Defenseman	United States	21	Fairfield, CT
Hunter McCoy	Forward	United States	21	Newburyport, MA
Michael Sacco	Forward	United States	21	Syosset, NY
Evan Szary	Goaltender	United States	21	Nashville, TN
Brad Zona	Defenseman	United States	21	Auburn, MA

== Roster ==
As of August 23, 2021.

No.	Nat.	Player	Class	Pos	Height	Weight	DoB	Hometown	Previous team	NHL rights
1	(United States)	Gavin Abric	Sophomore	G	6' 3" (1.91 m)	170 lb (77 kg)	2001-01-11	Hayward, Wisconsin	Jersey Hitmen (NCDC)	—
2	(United States)	Thomas Farrell (A)	Junior	D	6' 1" (1.85 m)	200 lb (91 kg)	1999-01-18	Mettawa, Illinois	Youngstown Phantoms (USHL)	—
3	(United States)	Brad Zona	Freshman	D	6' 1" (1.85 m)	205 lb (93 kg)	2000-08-01	Auburn, Massachusetts	New Jersey Titans (NAHL)	—
4	(United States)	Coby Mack	Senior	D	6' 3" (1.91 m)	213 lb (97 kg)	1997-10-07	Rapid City, South Dakota	Northern Cyclones (NCDC)	—
5	(United States)	Andrew Quetell	Senior	D	5' 11" (1.8 m)	185 lb (84 kg)	1998-06-21	Cleveland, Ohio	Johnstown Tomahawks (NAHL)	—
6	(United States)	Colin Bilek (C)	Senior	F	5' 11" (1.8 m)	180 lb (82 kg)	1997-06-04	Brighton, Michigan	Northeast Generals (NAHL)	—
7	(United States)	Andrew Gilbert	Freshman	D	6' 5" (1.96 m)	210 lb (95 kg)	2000-05-02	Fairfield, Connecticut	Jersey Hitmen (NCDC)	—
8	(United States)	Ricky Lyle	Sophomore	F	6' 1" (1.85 m)	187 lb (85 kg)	2000-08-21	Duluth, Minnesota	Madison Capitols (USHL)	—
9	(United States)	Daniel Haider (A)	Senior	F	5' 9" (1.75 m)	175 lb (79 kg)	1997-12-19	Anchorage, Alaska	Fairbanks Ice Dogs (NAHL)	—
10	(United States)	Jake Felker	Sophomore	F	5' 11" (1.8 m)	192 lb (87 kg)	2000-03-19	Omaha, Nebraska	Youngstown Phantoms (USHL)	—
11	(United States)	Lincoln Hatten	Sophomore	F	6' 3" (1.91 m)	185 lb (84 kg)	2000-03-01	Allen, Texas	Wilkes-Barre/Scranton Knights (NAHL)	—
12	(United States)	John Keranen	Junior	F	6' 2" (1.88 m)	190 lb (86 kg)	1998-08-31	Delano, Minnesota	Minnesota Magicians (NAHL)	—
13	(United States)	Michael Sacco	Freshman	F	5' 8" (1.73 m)	175 lb (79 kg)	1999-11-16	Syosset, New York	Wilkes-Barre/Scranton Knights (NAHL)	—
14	(United States)	Hunter McCoy	Freshman	F	6' 0" (1.83 m)	195 lb (88 kg)	2000-08-01	Newburyport, Massachusetts	Maryland Black Bears (NAHL)	—
15	(United States)	Marshal Plunkett	Senior	D	5' 10" (1.78 m)	175 lb (79 kg)	1998-10-31	West Salem, Wisconsin	Coulee Region Chill (NAHL)	—
16	(United States)	Eric Butte (C)	Senior	F	6' 1" (1.85 m)	185 lb (84 kg)	1997-05-28	Belmont, Massachusetts	Langley Rivermen (BCHL)	—
17	(United States)	Anthony Firriolo	Junior	D	5' 11" (1.8 m)	165 lb (75 kg)	1998-07-03	Montville, New Jersey	Corpus Christi IceRays (NAHL)	—
19	(United States)	Brett Abdelnour	Junior	F	5' 9" (1.75 m)	167 lb (76 kg)	1998-10-23	Macomb, Michigan	Amarillo Bulls (NAHL)	—
20	(United States)	Brody Medeiros	Sophomore	D	6' 0" (1.83 m)	200 lb (91 kg)	1999-01-25	Littleton, Colorado	New Jersey Titans (NAHL)	—
21	(United States)	Josh Bohlin	Freshman	F	6' 1" (1.85 m)	190 lb (86 kg)	2000-02-10	Wausau, Wisconsin	Minnesota Wilderness (NAHL)	—
22	(United States)	Noah Wilson	Junior	D	5' 11" (1.8 m)	205 lb (93 kg)	1998-12-21	Fond du Lac, Wisconsin	Fairbanks Ice Dogs (NAHL)	—
23	(United States)	Joey Baez	Freshman	F	5' 9" (1.75 m)	175 lb (79 kg)	2000-01-12	Tampa, Florida	Lone Star Brahmas (NAHL)	—
24	(United States)	Andrew Garby	Freshman	D	5' 9" (1.75 m)	160 lb (73 kg)	2000-09-17	Canton, Michigan	Fairbanks Ice Dogs (NAHL)	—
25	(United States)	Patrick Smyth	Junior	F	6' 4" (1.93 m)	220 lb (100 kg)	1999-04-23	Toledo, Ohio	Dubuque Fighting Saints (USHL)	—
26	(United States)	Mitch Machlitt	Sophomore	F	6' 2" (1.88 m)	180 lb (82 kg)	1999-01-15	Robbinsdale, Minnesota	New Jersey Titans (NAHL)	—
27	(United States)	Chris Konin	Sophomore	F	6' 1" (1.85 m)	196 lb (89 kg)	2000-01-04	West Kingston, Rhode Island	Minnesota Magicians (NAHL)	—
28	(United States)	Kendrick Frost	Junior	F	6' 4" (1.93 m)	195 lb (88 kg)	1999-04-01	Lee's Summit, Missouri	Brookings Blizzard (NAHL)	—
29	(United States)	Eric Huss	Sophomore	F	5' 11" (1.8 m)	181 lb (82 kg)	1999-03-16	Dallas, Texas	Lone Star Brahmas (NAHL)	—
31	(United States)	Evan Szary	Freshman	G	5' 11" (1.8 m)	175 lb (79 kg)	2000-02-29	Nashville, Tennessee	South Shore Kings (NCDC)	—
34	(United States)	Justin Evenson	Junior	G	6' 1" (1.85 m)	160 lb (73 kg)	1999-08-20	Minnetonka, Minnesota	Amarillo Bulls (NAHL)	—

== Standings ==
2021–22 Atlantic Hockey Standings
	Conference record										Overall record					
	GP	W	L	T	OW	OL	SW	PTS	GF	GA	GP	W	L	T	GF	GA
#18 American International †*	26	17	7	2	1	2	0	54	97	61	38	22	13	3	134	95
Canisius	26	13	11	2	2	1	1	43	76	67	35	16	16	3	99	97
Army	26	12	11	3	0	1	2	42	75	68	35	14	17	4	98	100
RIT	26	12	10	4	1	3	3	41	69	82	38	18	16	4	92	115
Sacred Heart	26	11	12	3	0	1	3	40	72	70	37	15	18	4	95	100
Air Force	26	11	12	3	3	2	2	37	76	80	36	16	17	3	99	127
Mercyhurst	26	10	12	4	0	1	1	36	75	79	39	16	19	4	114	129
Niagara	26	10	13	3	2	2	1	34	70	79	36	11	22	3	82	122
Bentley	26	10	14	2	1	2	1	34	70	78	36	14	20	2	94	117
Holy Cross	26	10	14	2	3	0	0	29	56	72	37	12	23	2	77	108
Championship: March 19, 2022 † indicates conference regular season champion * indicates conference tournament champion (Riley Trophy); Rankings: USCHO.com Top 20 Poll

== Schedule and results ==
Date	Time	Opponent^{#}	Rank^{#}	Site	TV	Decision	Result	Attendance	Record
Regular season
October 2	4:00 PM	at #12 Providence*		Schneider Arena • Providence, Rhode Island	NESN	Evenson	L 0–7	0	0–1–0 (0–0–0–0)
October 8	7:05 PM	RIT		Tate Rink • West Point, New York	Flo	Evenson	L 5–6	1,132	0–2–0 (0–1–0–0)
October 9	4:05 PM	RIT		Tate Rink • West Point, New York	Flo	Abric	T 3–2 ^{SOW}	1,279	0–2–1 (0–1–1–1)
October 14	8:00 PM	at Wisconsin*		Kohl Center • Madison, Wisconsin	BSW+	Abric	L 1–4	7,175	0–3–1 (0–1–1–1)
October 15	8:00 PM	at Wisconsin*		Kohl Center • Madison, Wisconsin	BSW	Abric	L 0–1	10,281	0–4–1 (0–1–1–1)
October 21	7:05 PM	at American International		MassMutual Center • Springfield, Massachusetts		Abric	L 3–4	195	0–5–1 (0–2–1–1)
October 22	7:05 PM	American International		Tate Rink • West Point, New York		Abric	W 2–0	1,516	1–5–1 (1–2–1–1)
October 30	4:05 PM	Princeton*		Tate Rink • West Point, New York		Abric	W 4–1	1,391	2–5–1 (1–2–1–1)
November 12	7:05 PM	Yale*		Tate Rink • West Point, New York		Abric	W 6–3	1,989	3–5–1 (1–2–1–1)
November 19	7:00 PM	at Niagara		Dwyer Arena • Lewiston, New York		Abric	T 3–3 ^{SOL}	437	3–5–2 (1–2–2–1)
November 20	5:00 PM	at Niagara		Dwyer Arena • Lewiston, New York		Abric	W 4–1	757	4–5–2 (2–2–2–1)
November 26	4:05 PM	at Bentley		Bentley Arena • Waltham, Massachusetts		Abric	L 1–3	1,275	4–6–2 (2–3–2–1)
November 27	4:05 PM	at Bentley		Bentley Arena • Waltham, Massachusetts		Abric	L 0–5	1,275	4–7–2 (2–4–2–1)
December 2	7:05 PM	Sacred Heart		Tate Rink • West Point, New York		Abric	W 4–1	1,068	5–7–2 (3–4–2–1)
December 11	5:05 PM	at RIT		Gene Polisseni Center • Henrietta, New York		Abric	W 6–0	2,213	6–7–2 (4–4–2–1)
December 12	5:05 PM	at RIT		Gene Polisseni Center • Henrietta, New York		Abric	W 4–3	1,269	7–7–2 (5–4–2–1)
January 1	5:05 PM	Penn State*		Tate Rink • West Point, New York		Abric	L 3–5	1,160	7–8–2 (5–4–2–1)
January 2	2:05 PM	Rensselaer*		Tate Rink • West Point, New York		Abric	T 3–3 ^{OT}	1,712	7–8–3 (5–4–2–1)
January 7	7:05 PM	Canisius		Tate Rink • West Point, New York		Abric	L 3–5	1,283	7–9–3 (5–5–2–1)
January 8	4:05 PM	Canisius		Tate Rink • West Point, New York		Abric	W 3–0	1,484	8–9–3 (6–5–2–1)
January 15	7:05 PM	Royal Military College*		Tate Rink • West Point, New York (Exhibition)			Cancelled		
January 18	6:05 PM	at Sacred Heart		Webster Bank Arena • Bridgeport, Connecticut		Abric	L 2–4	313	8–10–3 (6–6–2–1)
January 21	7:05 PM	Holy Cross		Tate Rink • West Point, New York		Abric	L 1–3	1,302	8–11–3 (6–7–2–1)
January 22	4:05 PM	Holy Cross		Tate Rink • West Point, New York		Abric	W 4–1	1,538	9–11–3 (7–7–2–1)
January 28	9:35 PM	at Air Force		Cadet Ice Arena • Colorado Springs, Colorado		Abric	W 8–3	3,032	10–11–3 (8–7–2–1)
January 29	7:05 PM	at Air Force		Cadet Ice Arena • Colorado Springs, Colorado		Abric	L 2–3 ^{OT}	2,175	10–12–3 (8–8–2–1)
February 4	7:05 PM	Mercyhurst		Tate Rink • West Point, New York		Abric	L 0–4	1,238	10–13–3 (8–9–2–1)
February 5	4:05 PM	Mercyhurst		Tate Rink • West Point, New York		Evenson	W 5–1	1,284	11–13–3 (9–9–2–1)
February 11	5:05 PM	American International		Tate Rink • West Point, New York		Evenson	L 1–5	252	11–14–3 (9–10–2–1)
February 12	6:05 PM	at American International		MassMutual Center • Springfield, Massachusetts		Abric	W 1–0	1,589	12–14–3 (10–10–2–1)
February 17	7:00 PM	at Holy Cross		Hart Center • Worcester, Massachusetts		Abric	W 2–1	207	13–14–3 (11–10–2–1)
February 18	7:00 PM	at Holy Cross		Hart Center • Worcester, Massachusetts		Abric	W 3–1	350	14–14–3 (12–10–2–1)
February 25	6:05 PM	at Sacred Heart		Webster Bank Arena • Bridgeport, Connecticut		Abric	L 2–5	853	14–15–3 (12–11–2–1)
February 26	4:05 PM	Sacred Heart		Tate Rink • West Point, New York		Abric	T 6–6 ^{SOL}	1,814	14–15–3 (12–11–3–1)
Atlantic Hockey Tournament
March 11	7:00 PM	Air Force*		Tate Rink • West Point, New York (Quarterfinal game 1)		Abric	L 4–5 ^{OT}	1,251	14–16–3
March 12	7:00 PM	Air Force*		Tate Rink • West Point, New York (Quarterfinal game 2)		Abric	L 2–3 ^{OT}	1,350	14–17–3
Army Lost Series 0–2
*Non-conference game. ^{#}Rankings from USCHO.com Poll. All times are in Eastern Time. Source:

== Scoring statistics ==
Name	Position	Games	Goals	Assists	Points	PIM
Colin Bilek	RW	34	11	20	31	37
Anthony Firriolo	D	35	9	12	21	26
Daniel Haider	F	30	8	12	20	6
Thomas Farrell	D	35	4	14	18	48
Eric Butte	F	35	11	6	17	10
Joey Baez	F	35	7	10	17	8
Ricky Lyle	LW	35	8	8	16	16
John Keranen	F	35	7	8	15	24
Brett Abdelnour	F	34	6	9	15	21
Marshal Plunkett	D	33	2	13	15	6
Mitch Machlitt	C	26	3	9	12	4
Jake Felker	F	35	2	7	9	2
Andrew Garby	D	23	1	8	9	10
Andrew Quetell	D	31	0	7	7	14
Michael Sacco	F	23	3	3	6	8
Coby Mack	D	25	2	4	6	23
Noah Wilson	D	30	1	5	6'	30
Eric Huss	F	14	3	2	5	4
Kendrick Frost	LW	21	3	2	5	8
Christopher Konin	F	19	2	3	5	6
Patrick Smyth	F	25	1	4	5	6
Hunter McCoy	F	18	2	1	3	4
Josh Bohlin	F	16	2	0	2	2
Brody Medeiros	D	9	0	1	1	0
Andrew Gilbert	D	1	0	0	0	0
Evan Szary	G	3	0	0	0	0
Justin Evenson	G	10	0	0	0	0
Gavin Abric	G	31	0	0	0	0
Total			98	167	265	323

== Goaltending statistics ==
Name	Games	Minutes	Wins	Losses	Ties	Goals against	Saves	Shut outs	SV %	GAA
Gavin Abric	31	1748	13	13	4	73	905	4	.925	2.51
Justin Evenson	10	376	1	4	0	21	193	0	.902	3.34
Empty Net	-	15	-	-	-	6	-	-	-	-
Total	35	2140	14	17	4	100	1098	4	.917	2.80

== Rankings ==
Poll	Week																									
Poll	Pre	1	2	3	4	5	6	7	8	9	10	11	12	13	14	15	16	17	18	19	20	21	22	23	24	25 (Final)
USCHO.com	NR	NR	NR	NR	NR	NR	NR	NR	NR	NR	NR	NR	NR	NR	NR	NR	NR	NR	NR	NR	NR	NR	NR	NR	-	NR
USA Today	NR	NR	NR	NR	NR	NR	NR	NR	NR	NR	NR	NR	NR	NR	NR	NR	NR	NR	NR	NR	NR	NR	NR	NR	NR	NR

Note: USCHO did not release a poll in week 24.

== Awards and honors ==
Player	Award	Ref
Colin Bilek	AHCA All-American East Second Team	
Daniel Haider	Atlantic Hockey Individual Sportsmanship Award	
Colin Bilek	Atlantic Hockey Regular Season Scoring Trophy	
Colin Bilek	Atlantic Hockey First Team	
Gavin Abric	Atlantic Hockey Second Team	
Anthony Firriolo	Atlantic Hockey Second Team	
