= 2021–22 Air Force Falcons men's ice hockey season =

- Conference: 6th Atlantic Hockey
- Home ice: Cadet Ice Arena

Rankings
- USCHO: NR
- USA Today: NR

Record
- Overall: 16–17–3
- Conference: 11–12–3
- Home: 8–9–1
- Road: 7–7–2
- Neutral: 1–1–0

Coaches and captains
- Head coach: Frank Serratore
- Assistant coaches: Andy Berg; Joe Doyle
- Captain(s): Luke Rowe; Alex Schilling
- Alternate captain(s): Blake Bride; Willie Reim

The 2021–22 Air Force Falcons men's ice hockey season is the 54th season of play for the program and the 16th season in the Atlantic Hockey conference. The Falcons represented the United States Air Force Academy and were coached by Frank Serratore, in his 25th season.

== Season ==
After the worst season for the program in 25 years and likely its most trying, Air Force returned to the ice ready to put COVID-19 in the past. At the start, senior netminder and team co-captain, Alex Schilling, got the starting role but didn't perform particularly well. The Falcons got off to a 2–5–1 start with Schilling allowing nearly 5 goals a game on average. Despite the horrid start, Frank Serratore stuck with Schilling and the goals against slowly declined as the team got into its conference schedule.

A bad stretch at home in November sent the Falcons to the bottom of the Atlantic Hockey standings. While they recovered a bit by taking a series against Canisius, Air Force opened the second half of its season getting swept by American International. Fortunately, the rest of January was kind to the Falcons and they won five of their next six games to pull back into the middle of the pack. The team was up and down in the final month of the regular season and Air Force ended up 6th, guaranteeing them a bye into the conference quarterfinals, but making them do so on the road.

Air Force began its postseason against their fellow service academy, Army. The first game was a see-saw battle that saw both teams take two 1-goal leads. The Falcon offense opened up on Army's goal, firing 51 shots in nearly 4 periods of work and managed to earn the overtime victory. The second match was just as close with the teams again trading leads but, again, Air Force netted a goal in overtime to sweep the series and make the semifinals. Their match against RIT turned out to be a series of short-lived leads for Air Force as the Tigers tied the game quickly on three separate occasions. Near the mid-point of the third, however, the Falcons finally were able to hold onto their lead and fended RIT off for the final 10 minutes to send the team to the championship game. Air Force's season ended with a thud when the team was completely dominated by AIC, 0–7. The Falcons kept the game close initially, but the team got into penalty trouble, taking 40 minutes worth of infractions, and allowed four power play goals.

== Departures ==
Player	Position	Nationality	Cause
Erik Anderson	Goaltender	United States	Graduation (retired)
Marshall Bowery	Forward	United States	Graduation (retired)
Thomas Daskas	Forward	United States	Transferred to Miami
Max Harper	Forward	United States	Graduation (retired)
Noah Kim	Defenseman	United States	Transferred to Wisconsin–River Falls
Shawn Knowlton	Forward	United States	Graduation (retired)
Zach LaRocque	Goaltender	United States	Graduation (retired)
Jacob Levin	Defenseman	United States	Graduation (retired)
Keenan Lund	Forward	United States	Transferred to Augsburg
Alex Mehnert	Defenseman	United States	Graduation (retired)
Zachary Mirageas	Defenseman	United States	Graduation (retired)

== Recruiting ==
Player	Position	Nationality	Age	Notes
Guy Blessing	Goaltender	United States	20	Chandler, AZ
Lucas Coon	Forward	United States	19	Steamboat Springs, CO
Clay Cosentino	Forward	United States	21	Framingham, MA
Andrew DeCarlo	Forward	United States	21	Huntington Beach, CA
Mitchell Digby	Forward	United States	21	Ottawa Lake, MI
Jason Kleinhans	Forward	United States	20	Herndon, VA
Jasper Lester	Defenseman	United States	21	Colorado Springs, CO
Frederick Paine	Defenseman	United States	20	Duluth, MN
Austin Schwartz	Forward	United States	20	Parker, CO
Drake Usher	Defenseman	United States	21	Upland, CA

== Roster ==
As of August 23, 2021.

No.	Nat.	Player	Class	Pos	Height	Weight	DoB	Hometown	Previous team	NHL rights
1	(United States)	Guy Blessing	Freshman	G	6' 3" (1.91 m)	180 lb (82 kg)	2001-05-08	Chandler, Arizona	Lone Star (NAHL)	—
2	(United States)	Andrew Kruse	Junior	D	6' 0" (1.83 m)	190 lb (86 kg)	1998-12-06	Delano, Minnesota	Minnesota Magicians (NAHL)	—
4	(United States)	Luke Rowe (C)	Junior	D	6' 1" (1.85 m)	200 lb (91 kg)	1998-08-08	Succasunna, New Jersey	Boston Jr. Bruins (NCDC)	—
7	(United States)	Brian Adams	Sophomore	F	5' 8" (1.73 m)	175 lb (79 kg)	1999-12-07	San Ramon, California	Wenatchee (BCHL)	—
8	(United States)	Blake Bride (A)	Junior	F	5' 11" (1.8 m)	180 lb (82 kg)	1998-04-22	Broomfield, Colorado	Sioux Falls (USHL)	—
9	(United States)	Lucas Coon	Freshman	F	6' 0" (1.83 m)	190 lb (86 kg)	2001-11-24	Steamboat Springs, Colorado	Odessa (NAHL)	—
10	(United States)	Austin Schwartz	Freshman	F	5' 9" (1.75 m)	170 lb (77 kg)	2001-06-18	Parker, Colorado	Bismarck (NAHL)	—
12	(United States)	Billy Duma	Senior	F	6' 0" (1.83 m)	195 lb (88 kg)	1997-11-17	Wayzata, Minnesota	Amarillo (NAHL)	—
14	(United States)	Jacob Marti	Sophomore	F	5' 11" (1.8 m)	185 lb (84 kg)	1999-06-10	Highlands Ranch, Colorado	Bismarck (NAHL)	—
15	(United States)	Bennett Norlin	Junior	F	6' 2" (1.88 m)	200 lb (91 kg)	1998-10-26	Farmington, Minnesota	West Kelowna (BCHL)	—
16	(United States)	Sam Brennan	Sophomore	D	6' 0" (1.83 m)	200 lb (91 kg)	2000-01-16	Brighton, Michigan	Lone Star (NAHL)	—
17	(United States)	Parker Brown	Sophomore	D	5' 10" (1.78 m)	155 lb (70 kg)	1999-09-08	Hanahan, South Carolina	Fairbanks (NAHL)	—
18	(United States)	Ty Pochipinski	Junior	F	5' 9" (1.75 m)	170 lb (77 kg)	1998-06-05	Colorado Springs, Colorado	Penticton (BCHL)	—
20	(United States)	Brandon Koch	Junior	D	6' 0" (1.83 m)	185 lb (84 kg)	1999-01-18	Hastings, Minnesota	Wenatchee (BCHL)	—
22	(United States)	Drake Usher	Freshman	D	6' 2" (1.88 m)	200 lb (91 kg)	2000-04-29	Upland, California	Wichita Falls (NAHL)	—
23	(United States)	Willie Reim (A)	Junior	F	6' 3" (1.91 m)	215 lb (98 kg)	1999-01-11	North Oaks, Minnesota	West Kelowna (BCHL)	—
24	(United States)	Nate Horn	Sophomore	F	5' 11" (1.8 m)	160 lb (73 kg)	1999-03-02	Elk River, Minnesota	Minnesota Wilderness (NAHL)	—
25	(United States)	Jason Kleinhans	Freshman	F	5' 11" (1.8 m)	175 lb (79 kg)	2000-10-04	Herndon, Virginia	Danbury (NAHL)	—
26	(United States)	Clayton Cosentino	Freshman	F	6' 2" (1.88 m)	190 lb (86 kg)	2000-06-18	San Carlos, California	Aberdeen (NAHL)	—
27	(United States)	Luke Robinson	Sophomore	D	6' 3" (1.91 m)	205 lb (93 kg)	2000-02-16	Nashville, Tennessee	Dubuque (USHL)	—
28	(United States)	Mitchell Digby	Freshman	D	5' 11" (1.8 m)	185 lb (84 kg)	2000-06-26	Ottawa Lake, Michigan	Lone Star (NAHL)	—
29	(United States)	Jasper Lester	Freshman	D	5' 11" (1.8 m)	175 lb (79 kg)	2000-07-31	Colorado Springs, Colorado	Fairbanks (NAHL)	—
33	(United States)	Alex Schilling (C)	Senior	G	6' 1" (1.85 m)	180 lb (82 kg)	1997-12-23	Medina, Minnesota	Austin (NAHL)	—
37	(United States)	Will Gavin	Sophomore	F	5' 10" (1.78 m)	185 lb (84 kg)	1999-10-21	Durham, Connecticut	Northern (NCDC)	—
41	(United States)	Austin Park	Junior	G	5' 11" (1.8 m)	170 lb (77 kg)	1998-06-05	Highlands Ranch, Colorado	Wenatchee (BCHL)	—
47	(United States)	Dalton Weigel	Junior	D	6' 0" (1.83 m)	195 lb (88 kg)	1999-12-30	Bloomington, Minnesota	Aberdeen (NAHL)	—
51	(United States)	Maiszon Balboa	Sophomore	G	6' 2" (1.88 m)	185 lb (84 kg)	2000-04-18	Colorado Springs, Colorado	Shreveport (NAHL)	—
77	(United States)	Frederick Paine	Freshman	D	6' 0" (1.83 m)	195 lb (88 kg)	2000-11-21	Duluth, Minnesota	Lone Star (NAHL)	—
82	(United States)	Andrew DeCarlo	Freshman	F	6' 0" (1.83 m)	185 lb (84 kg)	2000-07-23	Huntington Beach, California	Lone Star (NAHL)	—

== Standings ==
2021–22 Atlantic Hockey Standings
	Conference record										Overall record					
	GP	W	L	T	OW	OL	SW	PTS	GF	GA	GP	W	L	T	GF	GA
#18 American International †*	26	17	7	2	1	2	0	54	97	61	38	22	13	3	134	95
Canisius	26	13	11	2	2	1	1	43	76	67	35	16	16	3	99	97
Army	26	12	11	3	0	1	2	42	75	68	35	14	17	4	98	100
RIT	26	12	10	4	1	3	3	41	69	82	38	18	16	4	92	115
Sacred Heart	26	11	12	3	0	1	3	40	72	70	37	15	18	4	95	100
Air Force	26	11	12	3	3	2	2	37	76	80	36	16	17	3	99	127
Mercyhurst	26	10	12	4	0	1	1	36	75	79	39	16	19	4	114	129
Niagara	26	10	13	3	2	2	1	34	70	79	36	11	22	3	82	122
Bentley	26	10	14	2	1	2	1	34	70	78	36	14	20	2	94	117
Holy Cross	26	10	14	2	3	0	0	29	56	72	37	12	23	2	77	108
Championship: March 19, 2022 † indicates conference regular season champion * indicates conference tournament champion (Riley Trophy); Rankings: USCHO.com Top 20 Poll

== Schedule and results ==
Date	Time	Opponent^{#}	Rank^{#}	Site	TV	Decision	Result	Attendance	Record
Exhibition
October 2	6:00 PM	at Colorado College*		Ed Robson Arena • Colorado Springs, Colorado (Exhibition)			W 2–1	3,502	
Regular season
October 8	5:00 PM	at Michigan State*		Munn Ice Arena • East Lansing, Michigan		Schilling	W 3–2	4,420	1–0–0
October 9	5:00 PM	at Michigan State*		Munn Ice Arena • East Lansing, Michigan		Schilling	L 1–5	4,918	1–1–0
October 15	7:05 PM	#11 Denver*		Cadet Ice Arena • Colorado Springs, Colorado		Schilling	L 1–4	2,623	1–2–0
October 16	6:07 PM	at #11 Denver*		Magness Arena • Denver, Colorado		Schilling	L 0–8	4,926	1–3–0
October 23	3:00 PM	at Lindenwood*		Centene Community Ice Center • Maryland Heights, Missouri (Exhibition)			W 6–1		
October 24	3:00 PM	at Lindenwood*		Centene Community Ice Center • Maryland Heights, Missouri (Exhibition)			W 7–3		
October 29	7:05 PM	Colorado College*		Cadet Ice Arena • Colorado Springs, Colorado (Battle for Pikes Peak)		Schilling	W 5–4 ^{OT}	2,650	2–3–0
October 30	5:07 PM	at Colorado College*		Ed Robson Arena • Colorado Springs, Colorado (Battle for Pikes Peak)		Schilling	L 1–8	3,570	2–4–0
November 5	5:05 PM	at Niagara		Dwyer Arena • Lewiston, New York		Schilling	L 3–4	880	2–5–0 (0–1–0)
November 6	3:05 PM	at Niagara		Dwyer Arena • Lewiston, New York		Schilling	T 3–3 ^{SOW}	765	2–5–1 (0–1–1)
November 12	7:05 PM	Bentley		Cadet Ice Arena • Colorado Springs, Colorado		Schilling	W 2–1	1,968	3–5–1 (1–1–1)
November 13	5:05 PM	Bentley		Cadet Ice Arena • Colorado Springs, Colorado		Schilling	L 4–5	1,895	3–6–1 (1–2–1)
November 19	7:05 PM	Sacred Heart		Cadet Ice Arena • Colorado Springs, Colorado		Schilling	W 3–2	1,925	4–6–1 (2–2–1)
November 20	5:05 PM	Sacred Heart		Cadet Ice Arena • Colorado Springs, Colorado		Schilling	L 1–3	1,390	4–7–1 (2–3–1)
November 22	7:05 PM	Sacred Heart		Cadet Ice Arena • Colorado Springs, Colorado		Schilling	L 2–4	1,350	4–8–1 (2–4–1)
November 23	7:05 PM	Sacred Heart		Cadet Ice Arena • Colorado Springs, Colorado		Schilling	L 1–3	1,207	4–9–1 (2–5–1)
December 3	7:05 PM	Canisius		Cadet Ice Arena • Colorado Springs, Colorado		Schilling	W 5–2	1,652	5–9–1 (3–5–1)
December 4	5:05 PM	Canisius		Cadet Ice Arena • Colorado Springs, Colorado		Schilling	T 3–3 ^{SOW}	1,565	5–9–2 (3–5–2)
January 1	5:35 PM	at American International		MassMutual Center • Springfield, Massachusetts		Schilling	L 2–5	182	5–10–2 (3–6–2)
January 2	2:05 PM	at American International		MassMutual Center • Springfield, Massachusetts		Blessing	L 3–4	299	5–11–2 (3–7–2)
January 14	7:05 PM	Niagara		Cadet Ice Arena • Colorado Springs, Colorado		Blessing	W 5–4	1,157	6–11–2 (4–7–2)
January 15	5:05 PM	Niagara		Cadet Ice Arena • Colorado Springs, Colorado		Blessing	W 3–2	1,456	7–11–2 (5–7–2)
January 21	5:05 PM	at Mercyhurst		Mercyhurst Ice Center • Erie, Pennsylvania		Schilling	W 5–2	120	8–11–2 (6–7–2)
January 22	2:05 PM	at Mercyhurst		Mercyhurst Ice Center • Erie, Pennsylvania		Schilling	W 5–3	120	9–11–2 (7–7–2)
January 28	7:05 PM	Army		Cadet Ice Arena • Colorado Springs, Colorado		Schilling	L 3–8	3,032	9–12–2 (7–8–2)
January 29	5:05 PM	Army		Cadet Ice Arena • Colorado Springs, Colorado		Schilling	W 3–2 ^{OT}	2,175	10–12–2 (8–8–2)
February 4	5:00 PM	at Canisius		LECOM Harborcenter • Buffalo, New York		Schilling	L 2–4	523	10–13–2 (8–9–2)
February 5	5:00 PM	at Canisius		LECOM Harborcenter • Buffalo, New York		Schilling	W 3–2 ^{OT}	424	11–13–2 (9–9–2)
February 11	7:05 PM	Holy Cross		Cadet Ice Arena • Colorado Springs, Colorado		Schilling	L 2–3	1,327	11–14–2 (9–10–2)
February 12	5:05 PM	Holy Cross		Cadet Ice Arena • Colorado Springs, Colorado		Schilling	L 2–3	1,542	11–15–2 (9–11–2)
February 18	5:05 PM	at Bentley		Bentley Arena • Waltham, Massachusetts		Schilling	W 4–1	1,498	12–15–2 (10–11–2)
February 18	3:05 PM	at Bentley		Bentley Arena • Waltham, Massachusetts		Schilling	T 4–4 ^{SOL}	1,250	12–15–3 (10–11–3)
February 25	7:05 PM	RIT		Cadet Ice Arena • Colorado Springs, Colorado		Schilling	L 2–3 ^{OT}	1,401	12–16–3 (10–12–3)
February 26	5:05 PM	RIT		Cadet Ice Arena • Colorado Springs, Colorado		Schilling	W 1–0 ^{OT}	1,465	13–16–3 (11–12–3)
Atlantic Hockey Tournament
March 11	5:00 PM	at Army*		Tate Rink • West Point, New York (Quarterfinal game 1)		Schilling	W 5–4 ^{OT}	1,251	14–16–3
March 12	5:00 PM	at Army*		Tate Rink • West Point, New York (Quarterfinal game 2)		Schilling	W 3–2 ^{OT}	1,350	15–16–3
Air Force Won Series 2–0
March 18	5:35 PM	vs. RIT*		Adirondack Bank Center • Utica, New York (Semifinal)		Schilling	W 4–3	1,072	16–16–3
March 19	5:35 PM	vs. American International*		Adirondack Bank Center • Utica, New York (Championship)		Schilling	L 0–7	250	16–17–3
*Non-conference game. ^{#}Rankings from USCHO.com Poll. All times are in Mountain Time. Source:

== Scoring statistics ==
Name	Position	Games	Goals	Assists	Points	PIM
Will Gavin	F	35	16	13	29	73
Willie Reim	F	32	11	14	25	16
Brandon Koch	D	36	3	22	25	22
Clayton Cosentino	F	36	7	17	24	18
Nate Horn	F	33	11	11	22	19
Sam Brennan	D	34	6	13	19	38
Parker Brown	F	34	5	14	19	21
Mitchell Digby	D	36	6	12	18	33
Luke Rowe	D	35	6	10	16	54
Andrew DeCarlo	F	36	4	11	15	20
Lucas Coon	F	36	5	5	10	10
Austin Schwartz	F	36	3	5	8	10
Jacob Marti	F	33	2	5	7	58
Brian Adams	F	36	5	2	7	10
Bennett Norlin	F	36	1	6	7	4
Blake Bride	RW	31	3	3	6	11
Luke Robinson	D	36	1	3	4	37
Drake Usher	D	21	1	2	3	6
Ty Pochipinski	F	7	2	0	2	6
Andrew Kruse	D	23	1	0	1	0
Billy Duma	F	2	0	0	0	0
Maiszon Balboa	G	2	0	0	0	0
Jason Kleinhans	F	2	0	0	0	0
Austin Park	G	5	0	0	0	0
Dalton Weigel	D	5	0	0	0	2
Guy Blessing	G	8	0	0	0	0
Jasper Lester	D	27	0	0	0	12
Alex Schilling	G	34	0	0	0	0
Total			99	168	267	480

== Goaltending statistics ==
Name	Games	Minutes	Wins	Losses	Ties	Goals against	Saves	Shut outs	SV %	GAA
Austin Park	11	80	0	0	0	3	31	0	.912	2.23
Guy Blessing	17	198	2	1	0	10	80	1	.889	3.02
Alex Schilling	34	1897	14	16	3	111	802	2	.878	3.51
Maiszon Balboa	5	13	0	0	0	2	4	0	.667	9.27
Empty Net	-	23	-	-	-	1	-	-	-	-
Total	36	2212	16	17	3	127	917	3	.878	3.44

== Rankings ==
Poll	Week																									
Poll	Pre	1	2	3	4	5	6	7	8	9	10	11	12	13	14	15	16	17	18	19	20	21	22	23	24	25 (Final)
USCHO.com	NR	NR	NR	NR	NR	NR	NR	NR	NR	NR	NR	NR	NR	NR	NR	NR	NR	NR	NR	NR	NR	NR	NR	NR	-	NR
USA Today	NR	NR	NR	NR	NR	NR	NR	NR	NR	NR	NR	NR	NR	NR	NR	NR	NR	NR	NR	NR	NR	NR	NR	NR	NR	NR

Note: USCHO did not release a poll in week 24.

== Awards and honors ==
Player	Award	Ref
Brandon Koch	Atlantic Hockey Third Team	
Mitchell Digby	Atlantic Hockey Rookie Team	
Clayton Cosentino	Atlantic Hockey Rookie Team	
Brandon Koch	Atlantic Hockey All-Tournament Team	
Will Gavin	Atlantic Hockey All-Tournament Team	
