= 2021–22 Bentley Falcons men's ice hockey season =

- Conference: T–8th Atlantic Hockey
- Home ice: Bentley Arena

Rankings
- USCHO: NR
- USA Today: NR

Record
- Overall: 14–20–2
- Conference: 10–14–2
- Home: 8–7–2
- Road: 6–13–0

Coaches and captains
- Head coach: Ryan Soderquist
- Assistant coaches: Jon Coleman; Stephen Needham; Cam Doomany
- Captain: Ethan Roswell
- Alternate captain(s): Brendan Walkom; Marcus Walter

The 2021–22 Bentley Falcons men's ice hockey season was the 45th season of play for the program, the 23rd at the Division I level, and the 19th season in the Atlantic Hockey conference. The Falcons represented Bentley University and were coached by Ryan Soderquist, in his 20th season.

== Season ==
Bentley began its season in very good standing, defeating both Ohio State and Boston College in the first few weeks of the season. The Falcons cooled off a bit afterwards but still managed to win a few games as they tried to start out their goaltending situation. They began the year with Nicholas Grabko in goal but he never seemed to be able to put a string of good performances together. Unfortunately, the two other options (Evan Debrouwer and Jason Grande) didn't play any better.

In mid-November, Debrouwer got his second shot as the starter and made the most of his opportunity, winning five games in a row to put Bentley near the top of the Atlantic Hockey standings by the midpoint of the season.

After the winter break, Bentley had to reschedule several games around an uptick in COVID-19 positive tests that were affecting all of college hockey but seemed to get out of the trouble by the end of January. That was only the beginning of their trouble, however, as goaltending issues sent the Falcons careening towards the bottom of the conference. Debrouwer was never able to regain the form he had shown in November and December and allowed fewer than 3 goals in just two of his next nine games. Neither Grabko nor Grande could provide better support for the team in goal and Bentley ended up stumbling towards the finish. Even when their goaltenders were able to limit teams to just a few goals, the Falcons' offense went missing and Bentley finished the regular season with and 11-game winless streak.

They opened the postseason on the road against Niagara and completely reversed course, winning two matches to both end their streak and move onto the conference quarterfinals. The team's low position, however, sent them into a match with top-seeded American International and the Falcons were routed in back-to-back games.

== Departures ==
Player	Position	Nationality	Cause
Christian Felton	Defenseman	United States	Transferred to Merrimack
Will Garin	Forward	United States	Left program (retired)
Charlie Marchand	Defenseman	United States	Graduation (retired)
Jakov Novak	Forward	Canada	Transferred to Northeastern
Zach Pellegrino	Forward	United States	Transferred to Albertus Magnus
Luke Santerno	Forward	Canada	Graduate transfer to Clarkson
Devon Tongue	Forward	United States	Transferred to Trinity

== Recruiting ==
Player	Position	Nationality	Age	Notes
Cooper Connell	Forward	Canada	20	West Vancouver, BC
Evan Debrouwer	Goaltender	Canada	24	Blenheim, ON; transfer from Arizona State
Tucker Hodgson	Defenseman	United States	20	Grand Forks, ND
Phil Knies	Forward	Slovakia	23	Bratislava, SVK; graduate transfer from Miami
Eric Linell	Forward	United States	23	Great Neck, NY; transfer from Connecticut
Tanner Main	Defenseman	Canada	21	Welland, ON
Danny Pearson	Forward	Canada	21	West Vancouver, BC
Collin Rutherford	Forward	United States	23	Tonawanda, NY; graduate transfer from Dartmouth
Kohei Sato	Forward	Japan	24	Nishitōkyō, JPN; graduate transfer from New Hampshire
Harrison Scott	Forward	United States	21	San Jose, CA

== Roster ==
As of August 23, 2021.

No.	Nat.	Player	Class	Pos	Height	Weight	DoB	Hometown	Previous team	NHL rights
2	(United States)	Matt Clark	Sophomore	D	6' 1" (1.85 m)	185 lb (84 kg)	1999-05-10	Jamison, Pennsylvania	Topeka Pilots (NAHL)	—
3	(Canada)	Luke Orysiuk	Senior	D	6' 0" (1.83 m)	195 lb (88 kg)	1997-06-19	Edmonton, Alberta	Fairbanks Ice Dogs (NAHL)	—
4	(Canada)	Marcus Walter (A)	Junior	D	6' 3" (1.91 m)	195 lb (88 kg)	1999-06-14	St. Albert, Alberta	Alberni Valley Bulldogs (BCHL)	—
5	(United States)	Ethan Roswell (C)	Senior	D	5' 11" (1.8 m)	185 lb (84 kg)	1998-07-30	Paradise Valley, Arizona	Boston Junior Bruins (NCDC)	—
6	(United States)	Brendan Hamblet	Graduate	F	5' 11" (1.8 m)	180 lb (82 kg)	1998-11-05	Hopkinton, Massachusetts	Rivers School (USHS–MA)	—
7	(United States)	Ethan Harrison	Sophomore	F	6' 0" (1.83 m)	170 lb (77 kg)	2000-10-30	Plano, Texas	Sioux City Musketeers (USHL)	—
9	(United States)	Brendan Walkom (A)	Senior	F	6' 0" (1.83 m)	190 lb (86 kg)	1998-01-28	Pittsburgh, Pennsylvania	Madison Capitols (USHL)	—
10	(United States)	Dylan Pitera	Senior	F	6' 2" (1.88 m)	190 lb (86 kg)	1999-07-04	Culver, Indiana	Culver Academies (Midget AAA)	—
11	(United States)	Eric Linell	Junior	F	5' 8" (1.73 m)	165 lb (75 kg)	1998-09-17	Great Neck, New York	Connecticut (HEA)	—
12	(Canada)	Danny Pearson	Freshman	F	5' 10" (1.78 m)	185 lb (84 kg)	2000-06-01	Vancouver, British Columbia	Coquitlam Express (BCHL)	—
13	(United States)	Matt Gosiewski	Junior	F	6' 4" (1.93 m)	210 lb (95 kg)	1998-05-10	Wilton, Connecticut	Wenatchee Wild (BCHL)	—
14	(United States)	Matt Lombardozzi	Graduate	D	6' 1" (1.85 m)	200 lb (91 kg)	1997-06-27	Leominster, Massachusetts	Carleton Place Canadians (CCHL)	—
15	(Canada)	Cooper Connell	Freshman	F	6' 3" (1.91 m)	190 lb (86 kg)	2001-07-15	West Vancouver, British Columbia	Grande Prairie Storm (AJHL)	—
16	(United States)	Harrison Scott	Freshman	F	6' 0" (1.83 m)	185 lb (84 kg)	2000-09-27	San Jose, California	Amarillo Bulls (NAHL)	—
17	(United States)	Michael Zuffante	Graduate	F	5' 10" (1.78 m)	175 lb (79 kg)	1998-03-17	Bloomingdale, Illinois	Minnesota Wilderness (NAHL)	—
18	(Japan)	Kohei Sato	Graduate	F	6' 1" (1.85 m)	185 lb (84 kg)	1996-09-26	Nishitōkyō, Japan	New Hampshire (HEA)	—
19	(United States)	Collin Rutherford	Graduate	F	5' 9" (1.75 m)	165 lb (75 kg)	1997-12-29	Tonawanda, New York	Dartmouth (ECAC)	—
20	(United States)	Will Schlagenhauf	Senior	F	5' 9" (1.75 m)	175 lb (79 kg)	1998-10-12	Carmel, Indiana	Muskegon Lumberjacks (USHL)	—
21	(United States)	Cole Kodsi	Sophomore	F	6' 2" (1.88 m)	190 lb (86 kg)	2000-06-17	Boca Raton, Florida	Omaha (USHL)	—
22	(United States)	Drew Bavaro	Sophomore	D	6' 3" (1.91 m)	195 lb (88 kg)	2000-06-10	Bradenton, Florida	Wenatchee Wild (NAHL)	—
23	(United States)	Tucker Hodgson	Freshman	D	6' 2" (1.88 m)	195 lb (88 kg)	2001-06-07	Grand Forks, North Dakota	Fargo Force (USHL)	—
24	(United States)	Joe Winkelmann	Junior	F	5' 11" (1.8 m)	180 lb (82 kg)	2000-05-08	St. Louis, Missouri	Odessa Jackalopes (NAHL)	—
25	(United States)	Hunter Toale	Junior	D	6' 1" (1.85 m)	170 lb (77 kg)	1999-11-21	Coral Springs, Florida	Johnstown Tomahawks (NAHL)	—
26	(Canada)	Lucas Vanroboys	Junior	F	6' 2" (1.88 m)	175 lb (79 kg)	1999-07-24	Thamesville, Ontario	Prince George Spruce Kings (BCHL)	—
27	(United States)	A. J. Villella	Senior	D	6' 0" (1.83 m)	185 lb (84 kg)	1998-01-26	Davie, Florida	Northeastern (HEA)	—
28	(Canada)	Tanner Main	Freshman	D	5' 10" (1.78 m)	165 lb (75 kg)	2000-04-03	Welland, Ontario	Prince George Spruce Kings (BCHL)	—
29	(United States)	Nicholas Grabko	Sophomore	G	5' 11" (1.8 m)	180 lb (82 kg)	2000-02-06	Channahon, Illinois	Green Bay Gamblers (USHL)	—
30	(Canada)	Evan DeBrouwer	Graduate	G	6' 3" (1.91 m)	190 lb (86 kg)	1997-01-30	Blenheim, Ontario	Arizona State (NCAA)	—
33	(United States)	Jason Grande	Junior	G	6' 3" (1.91 m)	185 lb (84 kg)	1999-02-07	West Chester, Pennsylvania	Amarillo Bulls (NAHL)	—
34	(Canada)	Fraser Kirk	Senior	G	6' 2" (1.88 m)	180 lb (82 kg)	1997-10-07	Burlington, Ontario	Newmarket Hurricanes (OJHL)	—
38	(United States)	Phil Knies	Graduate	F	5' 9" (1.75 m)	170 lb (77 kg)	1998-06-04	Phoenix, Arizona	Miami (NCHC)	—

== Standings ==
2021–22 Atlantic Hockey Standings
	Conference record										Overall record					
	GP	W	L	T	OW	OL	SW	PTS	GF	GA	GP	W	L	T	GF	GA
#18 American International †*	26	17	7	2	1	2	0	54	97	61	38	22	13	3	134	95
Canisius	26	13	11	2	2	1	1	43	76	67	35	16	16	3	99	97
Army	26	12	11	3	0	1	2	42	75	68	35	14	17	4	98	100
RIT	26	12	10	4	1	3	3	41	69	82	38	18	16	4	92	115
Sacred Heart	26	11	12	3	0	1	3	40	72	70	37	15	18	4	95	100
Air Force	26	11	12	3	3	2	2	37	76	80	36	16	17	3	99	127
Mercyhurst	26	10	12	4	0	1	1	36	75	79	39	16	19	4	114	129
Niagara	26	10	13	3	2	2	1	34	70	79	36	11	22	3	82	122
Bentley	26	10	14	2	1	2	1	34	70	78	36	14	20	2	94	117
Holy Cross	26	10	14	2	3	0	0	29	56	72	37	12	23	2	77	108
Championship: March 19, 2022 † indicates conference regular season champion * indicates conference tournament champion (Riley Trophy); Rankings: USCHO.com Top 20 Poll

== Schedule and results ==
Date	Time	Opponent^{#}	Rank^{#}	Site	TV	Decision	Result	Attendance	Record
Regular season
October 2	7:00 PM	at Northeastern*		Matthews Arena • Boston, Massachusetts		Grabko	L 0–4	4,208	0–1–0
October 8	7:05 PM	Ohio State*		Bentley Arena • Waltham, Massachusetts		Grabko	W 2–1	1,585	1–1–0
October 9	6:05 PM	Ohio State*		Bentley Arena • Waltham, Massachusetts		DeBrouwer	L 1–7	1,359	1–2–0
October 16	7:05 PM	#6 Boston College*		Bentley Arena • Waltham, Massachusetts		Grabko	W 6–2	2,150	2–2–0
October 21	7:05 PM	at Holy Cross		Hart Center • Worcester, Massachusetts		Grabko	W 4–2	537	3–2–0 (1–0–0)
October 22	4:05 PM	Holy Cross		Bentley Arena • Waltham, Massachusetts		Grabko	L 2–3	1,761	3–3–0 (1–1–0)
October 30	8:00 PM	at #15 Harvard*		Bright-Landry Hockey Center • Boston, Massachusetts		Grabko	L 3–7	1,357	3–4–0
November 5	7:05 PM	Canisius		Bentley Arena • Waltham, Massachusetts		Grande	W 2–1	1,262	4–4–0 (2–1–0)
November 6	4:05 PM	Canisius		Bentley Arena • Waltham, Massachusetts		Grande	L 3–6	1,253	4–5–0 (2–2–0)
November 12	9:05 PM	at Air Force		Cadet Ice Arena • Colorado Springs, Colorado		Grabko	L 1–2	1,968	4–6–0 (2–3–0)
November 13	7:05 PM	at Air Force		Cadet Ice Arena • Colorado Springs, Colorado		Grande	W 5–4	1,895	5–6–0 (3–3–0)
November 19	1:05 PM	at American International		MassMutual Center • Springfield, Massachusetts		Grabko	L 0–5	293	5–7–0 (3–4–0)
November 20	1:05 PM	at American International		MassMutual Center • Springfield, Massachusetts		DeBrouwer	W 2–1	192	6–7–0 (4–4–0)
November 26	4:05 PM	Army		Bentley Arena • Waltham, Massachusetts		DeBrouwer	W 3–1	1,275	7–7–0 (5–4–0)
November 27	4:05 PM	Army		Bentley Arena • Waltham, Massachusetts		DeBrouwer	W 5–0	1,275	8–7–0 (6–4–0)
December 3	7:05 PM	Mercyhurst		Bentley Arena • Waltham, Massachusetts		DeBrouwer	W 4–3	1,131	9–7–0 (7–4–0)
December 4	5:05 PM	Mercyhurst		Bentley Arena • Waltham, Massachusetts		DeBrouwer	W 3–1	965	10–7–0 (8–4–0)
January 8	7:00 PM	at Merrimack*		J. Thom Lawler Rink • North Andover, Massachusetts		Grabko	L 1–4	1,093	10–8–0
January 14	7:05 PM	Sacred Heart		Bentley Arena • Waltham, Massachusetts		Kirk	L 1–5	689	10–9–0 (8–5–0)
January 15	5:05 PM	Sacred Heart		Bentley Arena • Waltham, Massachusetts		DeBrouwer	W 4–3	874	11–9–0 (9–5–0)
January 21	7:00 PM	at Canisius		LECOM Harborcenter • Buffalo, New York		DeBrouwer	W 7–4	582	12–9–0 (10–5–0)
January 22	7:00 PM	at Canisius		LECOM Harborcenter • Buffalo, New York		Grabko	L 1–2 ^{OT}	614	12–10–0 (10–6–0)
January 28	7:05 PM	RIT		Bentley Arena • Waltham, Massachusetts		DeBrouwer	L 1–2	897	12–11–0 (10–7–0)
January 30	2:05 PM	RIT		Bentley Arena • Waltham, Massachusetts		DeBrouwer	T 3–3 ^{SOL}	780	12–11–1 (10–7–1)
February 4	7:00 PM	at Niagara		Dwyer Arena • Lewiston, New York		DeBrouwer	L 5–6	611	12–12–1 (10–8–1)
February 5	5:05 PM	at Niagara		Dwyer Arena • Lewiston, New York		Grabko	L 2–3	585	12–13–1 (10–9–1)
February 10	7:05 PM	at Sacred Heart		Webster Bank Arena • Bridgeport, Connecticut		DeBrouwer	L 3–5	231	12–14–1 (10–10–1)
February 11	6:05 PM	at Sacred Heart		Webster Bank Arena • Bridgeport, Connecticut		Grabko	L 1–3	341	12–15–1 (10–11–1)
February 18	7:05 PM	Air Force		Bentley Arena • Waltham, Massachusetts		DeBrouwer	L 1–4	1,498	12–16–1 (10–12–1)
February 19	4:05 PM	Air Force		Bentley Arena • Waltham, Massachusetts		Grabko	T 4–4 ^{SOW}	1,250	12–16–2 (10–12–2)
February 25	7:05 PM	Holy Cross		Bentley Arena • Waltham, Massachusetts		DeBrouwer	L 2–3 ^{OT}	1,250	12–17–2 (10–13–2)
February 26	7:00 PM	at Holy Cross		Hart Center • Worcester, Massachusetts		DeBrouwer	L 1–2	650	12–18–2 (10–14–2)
Atlantic Hockey Tournament
March 4	7:00 PM	at Niagara*		Dwyer Arena • Lewiston, New York (First Round game 1)		DeBrouwer	W 3–2 ^{OT}	470	13–18–2
March 5	7:00 PM	at Niagara*		Dwyer Arena • Lewiston, New York (First Round game 2)		DeBrouwer	W 4–1	447	14–18–2
Bentley Won Series 2–0
March 11	7:00 PM	at American International*		MassMutual Center • Springfield, Massachusetts (Quarterfinal game 1)		DeBrouwer	L 2–5	410	14–19–2
March 12	7:00 PM	at American International*		MassMutual Center • Springfield, Massachusetts (Quarterfinal game 2)		DeBrouwer	L 2–6	310	14–20–2
Bentley Lost Series 0–2
*Non-conference game. ^{#}Rankings from USCHO.com Poll. All times are in Eastern Time. Source:

== Scoring statistics ==
Name	Position	Games	Goals	Assists	Points	PIM
Drew Bavaro	D	36	9	18	27	26
Cole Kodsi	LW	33	10	13	23	10
Matt Gosiewski	C	32	7	16	23	6
Dylan Pitera	F	35	7	13	20	29
Matt Lombardozzi	D	35	10	9	19	62
Collin Rutherford	C	34	7	10	17	2
Lucas Vanroboys	F	34	5	10	15	84
Danny Pearson	F	27	6	6	12	17
Luke Orysiuk	D	26	5	7	12	24
Kohei Sato	LW	31	5	7	12	26
Harrison Scott	F	33	4	7	11	22
Brendan Hamblet	F	35	4	7	11	14
Phil Knies	C/LW	10	2	6	8	2
Cooper Connell	F	22	3	4	7	2
Michael Zuffante	F	18	1	6	7	6
Ethan Roswell	D	34	0	6	6	4
Eric Linell	RW	34	4	1	5	8
Tanner Main	D	32	1	4	5	14
Brendan Walkom	F	31	0	5	5	6
Tucker Hodgson	D	36	2	2	4	45
Ethan Harrison	F	19	2	0	2	2
Will Schlagenhauf	F	6	0	1	1	2
Hunter Toale	D	9	0	1	1	8
Joe Winkelmann	C	11	0	1	1	0
Fraser Kirk	G	1	0	0	0	0
Jason Grande	G	6	0	0	0	0
Marcus Walter	D	12	0	0	0	10
Nicholas Grabko	G	13	0	0	0	4
Matt Clark	D	16	0	0	0	10
Evan Debrouwer	G	20	0	0	0	0
Total			94	160	254	455

== Goaltending statistics ==
Name	Games	Minutes	Wins	Losses	Ties	Goals Against	Saves	Shut Outs	SV %	GAA
Evan DeBrouwer	20	1139	9	9	1	52	512	1	.908	2.74
Nicholas Grabko	13	698	3	9	1	39	337	0	.896	3.35
Jason Grande	6	267	2	1	0	15	132	0	.898	3.37
Fraser Kirk	1	60	0	1	0	5	30	0	.857	5.00
Empty Net	-	18	-	-	-	6	-	-	-	-
Total	36	2183	14	20	2	117	1011	1	.896	3.22

== Rankings ==
Poll	Week																									
Poll	Pre	1	2	3	4	5	6	7	8	9	10	11	12	13	14	15	16	17	18	19	20	21	22	23	24	25 (Final)
USCHO.com	NR	NR	NR	NR	NR	NR	NR	NR	NR	NR	NR	NR	NR	NR	NR	NR	NR	NR	NR	NR	NR	NR	NR	NR	-	NR
USA Today	NR	NR	NR	NR	NR	NR	NR	NR	NR	NR	NR	NR	NR	NR	NR	NR	NR	NR	NR	NR	NR	NR	NR	NR	NR	NR

Note: USCHO did not release a poll in week 24.

== Awards and honors ==
Player	Award	Ref
Drew Bavaro	Atlantic Hockey First Team	
