= 2022 Atlantic Hockey men's ice hockey tournament =

2022 Atlantic Hockey Men's ice hockey tournament
- Dates: March 4–19, 2022
- Teams: 10
- Finals site: Adirondack Bank Center; Utica, New York
- Champions: American International (3rd title)
- Winning coach: Eric Lang (3rd title)
- MVP: Blake Bennett (American International)
- Atlantic Hockey Men's Ice Hockey Tournaments

The 2022 Atlantic Hockey Tournament was the 18th edition of the Atlantic Hockey Tournament. It was played between March 4 and March 19, 2022.

== Format ==
The tournament featured four rounds of play. The top six-seeded teams received byes into the quarterfinal round. In the first round, the seventh-seed hosted the tenth-seed and the eighth-seed hosted the ninth-seed in best-of-three series. The teams that advanced out of the first round are reseeded with the lowest remaining seep playing the first-seed and higher-seed playing the second seed. The other quarterfinal matches have the third seed playing the sixth-seed and the fourth-seed playing the fifth-seed. The higher-seeded teams serve as hosts in the quarterfinal round. All quarterfinal matches are best-of-three series. The four teams that advance out of the quarterfinals will be reseeded with the highest remaining seed playing the lowest remaining seed while the other two teams play one another. Beginning with the semifinal round, all matches become single-elimination. Also beginning with the semifinal round, all games will be played at the Adirondack Bank Center in Utica, New York. The winners of two the semifinal games will play one another to determine the Atlantic Hockey Tournament Champion and receive the conference's automatic bid to the 2022 NCAA Division I Men's Ice Hockey Tournament.

== Conference standings ==
2021–22 Atlantic Hockey Standings
	Conference record										Overall record					
	GP	W	L	T	OW	OL	SW	PTS	GF	GA	GP	W	L	T	GF	GA
#18 American International †*	26	17	7	2	1	2	0	54	97	61	38	22	13	3	134	95
Canisius	26	13	11	2	2	1	1	43	76	67	35	16	16	3	99	97
Army	26	12	11	3	0	1	2	42	75	68	35	14	17	4	98	100
RIT	26	12	10	4	1	3	3	41	69	82	38	18	16	4	92	115
Sacred Heart	26	11	12	3	0	1	3	40	72	70	37	15	18	4	95	100
Air Force	26	11	12	3	3	2	2	37	76	80	36	16	17	3	99	127
Mercyhurst	26	10	12	4	0	1	1	36	75	79	39	16	19	4	114	129
Niagara	26	10	13	3	2	2	1	34	70	79	36	11	22	3	82	122
Bentley	26	10	14	2	1	2	1	34	70	78	36	14	20	2	94	117
Holy Cross	26	10	14	2	3	0	0	29	56	72	37	12	23	2	77	108
Championship: March 19, 2022 † indicates conference regular season champion * indicates conference tournament champion (Riley Trophy); Rankings: USCHO.com Top 20 Poll

== Bracket ==
Teams are reseeded for the semifinals

First round March 4–6
7	Mercyhurst	2*	2	–
10	Holy Cross	1	1	–
8	Niagara	2	1	–
9	Bentley	3*	4	–

Quarterfinals; March 11–13
1	American International	5	6	–
9	Bentley	2	2	–
2	Canisius	1	1	–
7	Mercyhurst	2**	3	–
3	Army	4	2	–
6	Air Force	5*	3*	–
4	RIT	1*	1	3
5	Sacred Heart	0	3	1

Semifinals; March 18
1	American International	5
7	Mercyhurst	4
4	RIT	3
6	Air Force	4

Championship; March 19
1	American International	7
6	Air Force	0

Note: * denotes overtime period(s)

== Results ==
=== First round ===
==== (7) Mercyhurst vs. (10) Holy Cross ====
March 4, 2022; 7:05 PM	Mercyhurst	2 – 1 (OT) (0–1, 0–0, 1–0, 1–0)	Holy Cross	Mercyhurst Ice Center; Attendance: 687

Game reference

Kyle McClellan
Goalies
Matt Radomsky
Referees:
Danny Bethmann
Andy Bethmann
Linesmen:
Matt Terreri
James Rogowsky

	0–1	14:24 – Matt Guerra (7) (Cicero, Gelatt)
(McDougall, Feduolov) Carson Brière (12) – PP – 43:45	1–1
(Dahm, Kitt) Paul Maust (3) – GW – 63:57	2–1

19 min
Penalties
6 min
15
Shots
33

March 5, 2022; 7:05 PM	Mercyhurst	2 – 1 (0–0, 1–0, 1–1)	Holy Cross	Mercyhurst Ice Center; Attendance: 704

Game reference

Kyle McClellan
Goalies
Erik Gordon
Referees:
Chris Leavitt
Brendan Blanchard
Linesmen:
Garrett Gaydosh
Brian Kimmins

(unassisted) Carson Brière (13) – 36:21	1–0
(Kitt) Paul Maust (4) – GW – 42:38	2–0
	2–1	45:41 – Ryan Leibold (10) (Ricketts, Hale)

4 min
Penalties
6 min
20
Shots
43

Mercyhurst Won Series 2–0

==== (8) Niagara vs. (9) Bentley ====
March 4, 2022; 7:00 PM	Niagara	2 – 3 (OT) (0–0, 1–1, 1–1, 0–1)	Bentley	Dwyer Arena; Attendance: 470

Game reference

Chad Veltri
Goalies
Evan DeBrouwer
Referees:
Chris Leavitt
Brendan Blanchard
Linesmen:
Garrett Gaydosh
Brian Kimmins

	0–1	24:38 – Lucas Vanroboys (5) (Kodsi, Pitera)
(Randklev, Harpur) Shane Ott (8) – PP – 33:07	1–1
	1–2	49:30 – Collin Rutherford (6) (Kodsi, Pitera)
(Ott, Harpur) Carter Randklev (6) – PP – 52:26	2–2
	2–3	69:47 – GW – Collin Rutherford (5) (Orysiuk)

4 min
Penalties
4 min
32
Shots
32

March 5, 2022; 7:00 PM	Niagara	1 – 4 (1–2, 0–0, 0–2)	Bentley	Dwyer Arena; Attendance: 447

Game reference

Chad Veltri
Goalies
Evan DeBrouwer
Referees:
Matt Terreri
James Rogowsky
Linesmen:
Danny Bethmann
Andy Bethmann

	0–1	12:24 – PP – Brendan Hamblet (4) (Orysiuk, Bavaro)
	0–2	13:34 – GW – Kohei Sato (4) (Connell, Roswell)
(Wishman, Cox) Walker Sommer (8) – 14:17	1–2
	1–3	44:32 – Cole Kodsi (9) (Bavaro, Vanroboys)
	1–4	56:33 – Cole Kodsi (10) (Hodgson, Pitera)

8 min
Penalties
8 min
28
Shots
19

Bentley Won Series 2–0

=== Quarterfinals ===
==== (1) American International vs. (9) Bentley ====
March 11, 2022; 7:00 PM	American International	5 – 2 (2–1, 1–1, 2–0)	Bentley	MassMutual Center; Attendance: 410

Game reference

Alec Calvaruso
Goalies
Evan DeBrouwer
Referees:
William Brennan
Ryan Sweeney
Linesmen:
Anthony Valle
Patrick Philbin

	0–1	08:33 – SH – Kohei Sato (5) (Pitera)
(Lindner, Young) Elijiah Barriga (8) – PP – 09:44	1–1
(Young, Somerville) Chris Theodore (3) – 16:22	2–1
	2–2	22:37 – Dylan Pitera (7) (unassisted)
(Rigali, Galambos) Jake Stella (11) – GW PP – 38:14	3–2
(Rigali, Maver) Chris Van Os-Shaw (7) – 52:14	4–2
(Theodore, Barriga) Justin Young (11) – EN – 58:10	5–2

8 min
Penalties
8 min
30
Shots
27

March 12, 2022; 7:00 PM	American International	6 – 2 (3–1, 1–0, 2–1)	Bentley	MassMutual Center; Attendance: 310

Game reference

Alec Calvaruso
Goalies
Evan DeBrouwer
Referees:
Chris Leavitt
Brendan Blanchard
Linesmen:
Shane Kanaly
Robert Peterkin

(Dodero, Galambos) Brian Rigal (12) – PP – 01:38	1–0
(Janhonen, Long) Blake Bennett (12) – 02:37	2–0
	2–1	07:24 – Matt Lombardozzi (9) (Connell, Orysiuk)
(Barriga, Cole) Chris Dodero (11) – GW – 11:57	3–1
(Lindner, Young) Blake Bennett (13) – PP – 29:11	4–1
	4–2	48:37 – PP – Matt Lombardozzi (10) (Zuffante, Vanroboys)
(Bennett) Austen Long (3) – 51:38	5–2
(Galambos) Blake Bennett (14) – EN – 58:48	6–2

8 min
Penalties
10 min
27
Shots
22

American International Won Series 2–0

==== (2) Canisius vs. (7) Mercyhurst ====
March 11, 2022; 7:00 PM	Canisius	1 – 2 (2OT) (0–0, 1–1, 0–0, 0–0, 0–1)	Mercyhurst	LECOM Harborcenter; Attendance: 513

Game reference

Jacob Barczewski
Goalies
Kyle McClellan
Referees:
Brendan Lewis
Joe Sherman
Linesmen:
Michael Schubert
CJ Hallman

	0–1	11:49 – Austin Heidemann (9) (Dahm, St. Onge)
(Haar, Erne) Cory Thomas (2) – 33:57	1–1
	1–2	83:20 – GW PP – Owen Norton (10) (Sheriff)

8 min
Penalties
4 min
33
Shots
35

March 12, 2022; 7:00 PM	Canisius	1 – 3 (0–1, 1–0, 0–2)	Mercyhurst	LECOM Harborcenter; Attendance: 443

Game reference

Jacob Barczewski
Goalies
Kyle McClellan
Referees:
Matt Terreri
Joe Gladnick
Linesmen:
Kenneth Gates
Adam Tobias

	0–1	11:49 – Rylee St. Onge (12) (Burns, McDougall)
(Haar, Lambert) Ryan Miotto (7) – 28:58	1–1
	1–2	45:21 – GW – Jonathan Bendorf (10) (unassisted)
	1–3	58:21 – EN – Rylee St. Onge (13) (Townend, Reifenberger)

12 min
Penalties
10 min
30
Shots
26

Mercyhurst Won Series 2–0

==== (3) Army vs. (6) Air Force ====
March 11, 2022; 7:00 PM	Army	4 – 5 (OT) (1–2, 3–1, 0–1, 0–1)	Air Force	Tate Rink; Attendance: 1,251

Game reference

Gavin Abric
Goalies
Alex Schilling
Referees:
Chris Leavitt
Brendan Blanchard
Linesmen:
Shane Kanaly
Robert Peterkin

	0–1	06:43 – Willie Reim (10) (Horn)
(Sacco, Plunkett) Joey Baez (7) – 16:55	1–1
	1–2	19:06 – PP – Sam Brennan (6) (Gavin, Brown)
(unassisted) Eric Huss (3) – 24:02	2–2
(Haider, Baez) Eric Butte (11) – PP – 25:34	3–2
	3–3	26:12 – Willie Reim (11) (Horn, Brennan)
(Felker, Smyth) Noah Wilson (1) – 36:47	4–3
	4–4	52:54 – Luke Robinson (1) (Gavin, Digby)
	4–5	75:30 – GW – Blake Bride (13) (Brennan, Schwartz)

4 min
Penalties
6 min
37
Shots
51

March 12, 2022; 7:00 PM	Army	2 – 3 (OT) (0–0, 2–1, 0–1, 0–1)	Air Force	Tate Rink; Attendance: 1,350

Game reference

Gavin Abric
Goalies
Alex Schilling
Referees:
William Brennan III
Ryan Sweeney
Linesmen:
Anthony Valle
Bobby Griffin

	0–1	06:43 – Will Gavin (15) (Cosentino)
(Firriolo, Farrell) Brett Abdelnour (6) – 30:14	1–1
(Plunkett, Baez) Daniel Haider (8) – 37:30	2–1
	2–2	42:36 – Austin Schwartz (6) (unassisted)
	2–3	61:02 – GW – Parker Brown (5) (Digby)

0 min
Penalties
17 min
33
Shots
35

Air Force Won Series 2–0

==== (4) RIT vs. (5) Sacred Heart ====
March 11, 2022; 7:00 PM	RIT	1 – 0 (OT) (0–0, 0–0, 0–0, 1–0)	Sacred Heart	Gene Polisseni Center; Attendance: 1,104

Game reference
Tommy Scarfone	Goalies	Justin Robbins	Referees: Adam Tobias; Kenneth Gates; Linesmen: Matt Terreri; Joe Gladnick
(Walker, Bruce) Dan Willett (3) – GW – 70:17 / 1–0			Referees: Adam Tobias; Kenneth Gates; Linesmen: Matt Terreri; Joe Gladnick
6 min	Penalties	21 min	Referees: Adam Tobias; Kenneth Gates; Linesmen: Matt Terreri; Joe Gladnick
26	Shots	39	Referees: Adam Tobias; Kenneth Gates; Linesmen: Matt Terreri; Joe Gladnick

March 12, 2022; 7:00 PM	RIT	1 – 3 (0–1, 1–2, 0–0)	Sacred Heart	Gene Polisseni Center; Attendance: 1,195

Game reference

Tommy Scarfone
Goalies
Justin Robbins
Referees:
Michael Schubert
CJ Hallman
Linesmen:
Brendan Lewis
Joe Sherman

	0–1	12:07 – Dante Palecco (3) (Dawson)
	0–2	27:21 – GW – Adam Tisdale (2) (Tuck, Shea)
	0–3	28:32 – Braeden Tuck (12) (Shea, Britt)
(Bruce, Andrew) Gianfranco Cassaro (3) – PP – 32:23	1–3

8 min
Penalties
23 min
18
Shots
26

March 13, 2022; 5:00 PM	RIT	3 – 1 (0–1, 1–0, 2–0)	Sacred Heart	Gene Polisseni Center; Attendance: 805

Game reference

Tommy Scarfone
Goalies
Justin Robbins
Referees:
Michael Schubert
CJ Hallman
Linesmen:
Brendan Lewis
Joe Sherman

	0–1	03:32 – Austin Magera (10) (Goehring)
(Nicholson) Kobe Walker (11) – 36:59	1–1
(Hamacher, Berry) Carter Wilkie (13) – GW – 42:06	2–1
(unassisted) Dan Willett (4) – PP – 42:44	3–1

8 min
Penalties
6 min
31
Shots
31

RIT Won Series 2–1

=== Semifinal ===
==== (1) American International vs. (7) Mercyhurst ====
March 18, 2022; 4:05 PM	American International	5 – 4 (0–1, 2–2, 3–1)	Mercyhurst	Adirondack Bank Center; Attendance: 904

Game reference

Alec Calvaruso
Goalies
Kyle McClellan
Referees:
Chris Leavitt
Brendan Blanchard
Linesmen:
Bobby Griffin
Brendan Lewis

	0–1	12:32 – Dante Sheriff (8) (unassisted)
(Callahan, Janhonen) Blake Bennett (15) – 22:28	1–1
(Long, Callahan) Blake Bennett (16) – 28:34	2–1
	2–2	31:29 – Austin Heidemann (12) (Daniels, Sheriff)
	2–3	33:28 – PP – Rylee St. Onge (14) (McDougall)
(Van Os-Shaw, Rigali) Zak Galambos (4) – 43:48	3–3
(unassisted) Blake Bennett (17) – 54:44	4–3
(Cole) Elijiah Barriga (9) – GW EN – 57:41	5–3
	5–4	58:40 – EA – Rylee St. Onge (15) (Burns)

4 min
Penalties
4 min
49
Shots
21

==== (4) RIT vs. (6) Air Force ====
March 18, 2022; 7:35 PM	RIT	3 – 4 (0–1, 1–1, 2–2)	Air Force	Adirondack Bank Center; Attendance: 904

Game reference

Tommy Scarfone
Goalies
Alex Schilling
Referees:
Ryan Sweeney
Michael Schubert
Linesmen:
Anthony Valle
Shane Kanaly

	0–1	13:38 – Will Gavin (16) (Rowe)
(Bruce, Calverley) Aiden Hansen-Bukata (2) – 16:55	1–1
	1–2	39:25 – Andrew DeCarlo (6) (Cosentino, Brown)
(Wilkie) Dan Willett (5) – PP – 44:15	2–2
	2–3	44:59 – PP – Brandon Koch (2) (Rowe, Gavin)
(Wilkie) Grady Hobbs (7) – 45:36	3–3
	3–4	49:53 – GW – Brandon Koch (13) (Rowe, Cosentino)

4 min
Penalties
4 min
27
Shots
26

=== Championship ===
==== (1) American International vs. (6) Air Force ====
March 19, 2022; 7:35 PM	American International	7 – 0 (1–0, 3–0, 3–0)	Air Force	Adirondack Bank Center; Attendance: 250

Game reference

Alec Calvaruso
Goalies
Alex Schilling
Referees:
Ryan Sweeney
Michael Schubert
Linesmen:
Anthony Valle
Shane Kanaly

(Bennett) Julius Janhonen (5) – GW – 05:16	1–0
(Dodero, Galambos) Jake Stella (12) – PP – 21:37	2–0
(Lindner, Galambos) Chris Dodero (12) – 27:32	3–0
(Dodero, Stella) Zak Galambos (5) – PP – 29:56	4–0
(Cole) Chris Dodero (13) – SH – 49:14	5–0
(Barriga, Somerville) Blake Bennett (18) – PP – 51:10	6–0
(Rigali, Bennett) Julius Janhonen (6) – PP – 53:57	7–0

4 min
Penalties
40 min
31
Shots
18

== Tournament awards ==
=== All-Tournament Team ===
- G: Alec Calvaruso (American International)
- D: Brandon Koch (Air Force)
- D: Zak Galambos (American International)
- F: Blake Bennett* (American International)
- F: Chris Dodero (American International)
- F: Will Gavin (Air Force)

* Most Valuable Player(s)
