= Drew Bavaro =

American ice hockey player (born 2000)

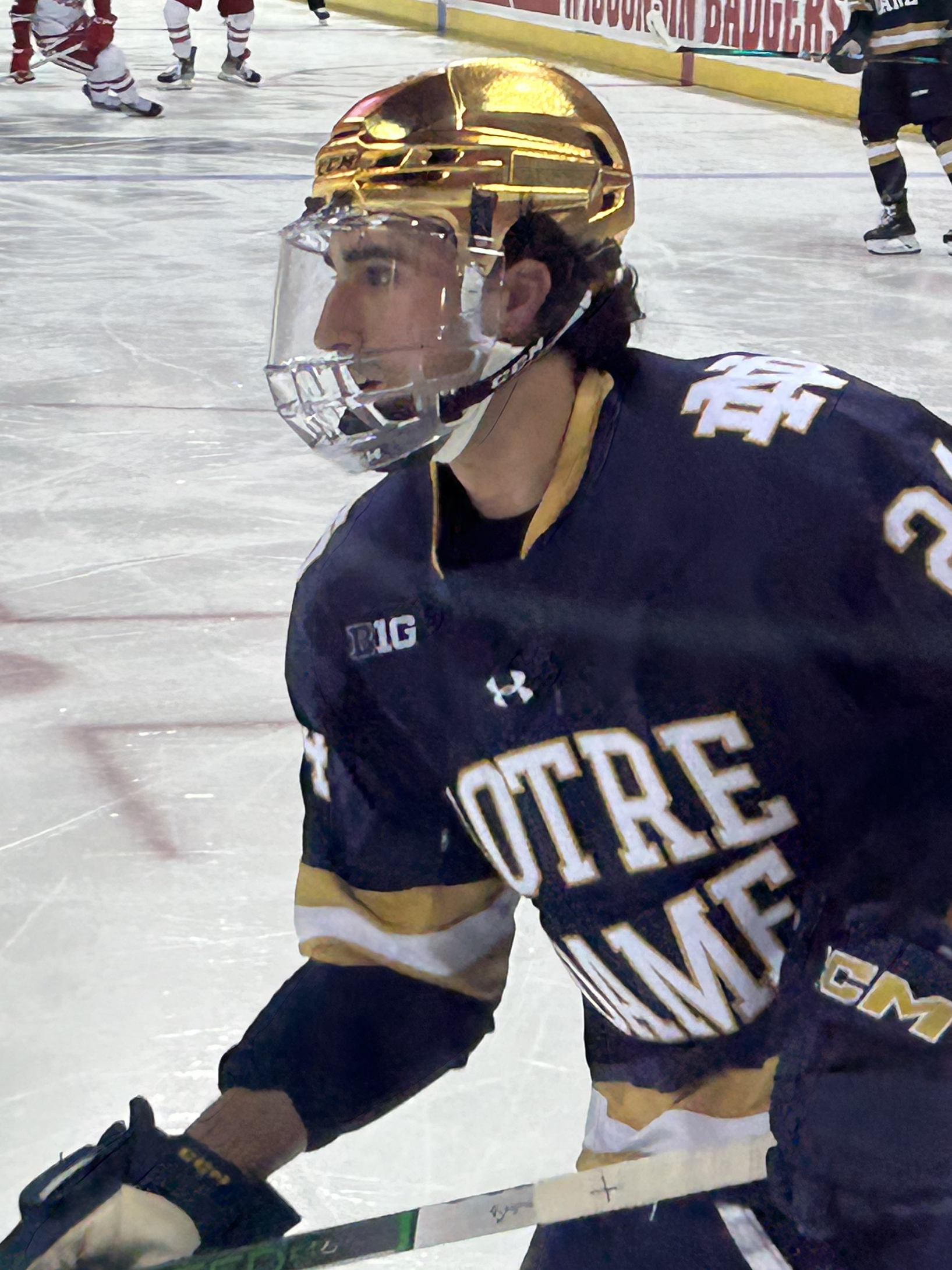
- Bavaro playing with the University of Notre Dame in February 2024
- Born: June 10, 2000 (age 26) Bradenton, Florida, U.S.
- Height: 6 ft 2 in (188 cm)
- Weight: 198 lb (90 kg; 14 st 2 lb)
- Position: Defense
- Shot: Right
- Played for: Providence Bruins; Cleveland Monsters
- NHL draft: Undrafted
- Playing career: 2024–2025

Drew Thomas Bavaro (born June 10, 2000) is a former American professional ice hockey player. He played college ice hockey for Bentley University and University of Notre Dame of the National Collegiate Athletic Association (NCAA).

== Playing career ==
=== Collegiate ===
==== Bentley University ====
After playing one year with the Wenatchee Wild of the British Columbia Hockey League (BCHL), Bavaro committed to play hockey at Bentley University starting in the 2021–22 season. Bavaro scored 2 goals and 10 assists in 16 games for the Falcons, earning him Atlantic Hockey Association All-Rookie team honors. However, Bentley's season would come to an abrupt end in the AHA tournament when they had to withdraw in the second round due to positive COVID-19 tests amidst the pandemic.

Bavaro had a successful second season with the Falcons, leading the Atlantic Hockey Association in points by a defenseman with 24, and was named a semi-finalist for the Walter Brown Award, which is awarded to the top-American born player playing in New England., as well as being named to the All-Atlantic Hockey First Team. After the season, Bavaro announced that he would be transferring to University of Notre Dame to finish out his collegiate hockey career.

==== University of Notre Dame ====
Bavaro's production dipped in his first season at Notre Dame, scoring only 19 points in 37 games. Notre Dame would be eliminated by Michigan in the first round of the 2023 Big Ten tournament.

Bavaro scored 10 goals and 10 assists in his second season at Notre Dame. The team was once again eliminated by Michigan in the first round of the 2024 Big Ten tournament.

=== Professional ===
==== Boston Bruins ====
After the elimination in the Big Ten Tournament, it was announced on March 12, 2024, that the Boston Bruins had signed Bavaro to a one-year, US$867,500 deal. Bavaro would report to the Bruins AHL affiliate, the Providence Bruins for the remainder for the season on an amateur tryout contract for the rest of the 2023–24 season.

Bavaro's start to his professional career did not go as he had hoped. In seven games with the Providence Bruins, Bavaro did not find the scoresheet, and had a negative +/-. Bavaro was scratched for all four of Providence's playoff games against the Hartford Wolf Pack, whom they were eliminated by in the first round.

During the 2024–25 season, Bavaro made just 20 appearances with Providence and registered 3 assists before he was loaned to fellow AHL club, the Cleveland Monsters, for the remainder of the season on March 10, 2025. After being loaned to the Monsters, Bavaro scored a goal and four assists in 15 games. He would play one playoff game for the Monsters, Game 4 of the division semifinals against the Laval Rocket, before the Monsters were eliminated by the Rocket in that same game.

After the season, the Bruins announced they would not give Bavaro a qualifying offer, making him a unrestricted free agent. After going unsigned, Bavaro retired from professional hockey.

== Personal life ==
Bavaro played high school hockey at Lawrence Academy, where he served as captain for two years. Bavaro's brother, Vito Bavaro, played college hockey at Sacred Heart University.

Bavaro is not related to former Notre Dame football player Mark Bavaro.

== Career statistics ==
			Regular season					Playoffs
Season	Team	League	GP	G	A	Pts	PIM	GP	G	A	Pts	PIM
2019–20	Wenatchee Wild	BCHL	51	9	24	33	26	5	0	1	1	2
2020–21	Bentley University	AHA	16	2	10	12	8	—	—	—	—	—
2021–22	Bentley University	AHA	36	9	18	27	26	—	—	—	—	—
2022–23	University of Notre Dame	B1G	37	6	13	19	31	—	—	—	—	—
2023–24	University of Notre Dame	B1G	35	10	10	20	38	—	—	—	—	—
2023–24	Providence Bruins	AHL	7	0	0	0	8	—	—	—	—	—
2024–25	Maine Mariners	ECHL	2	1	0	1	2	—	—	—	—	—
2024–25	Providence Bruins	AHL	20	0	3	3	6	—	—	—	—	—
2024–25	Cleveland Monsters	AHL	15	1	4	5	6	1	0	0	0	0
AHL totals			42	1	7	8	20	1	0	0	0	0

== Awards and honors ==
Award	Year	Ref
College
All-Atlantic Hockey Rookie Team	2020–21	
All-Atlantic Hockey First Team	2021–22	
