= Tate Rink =

Hockey rink in West Point, New York

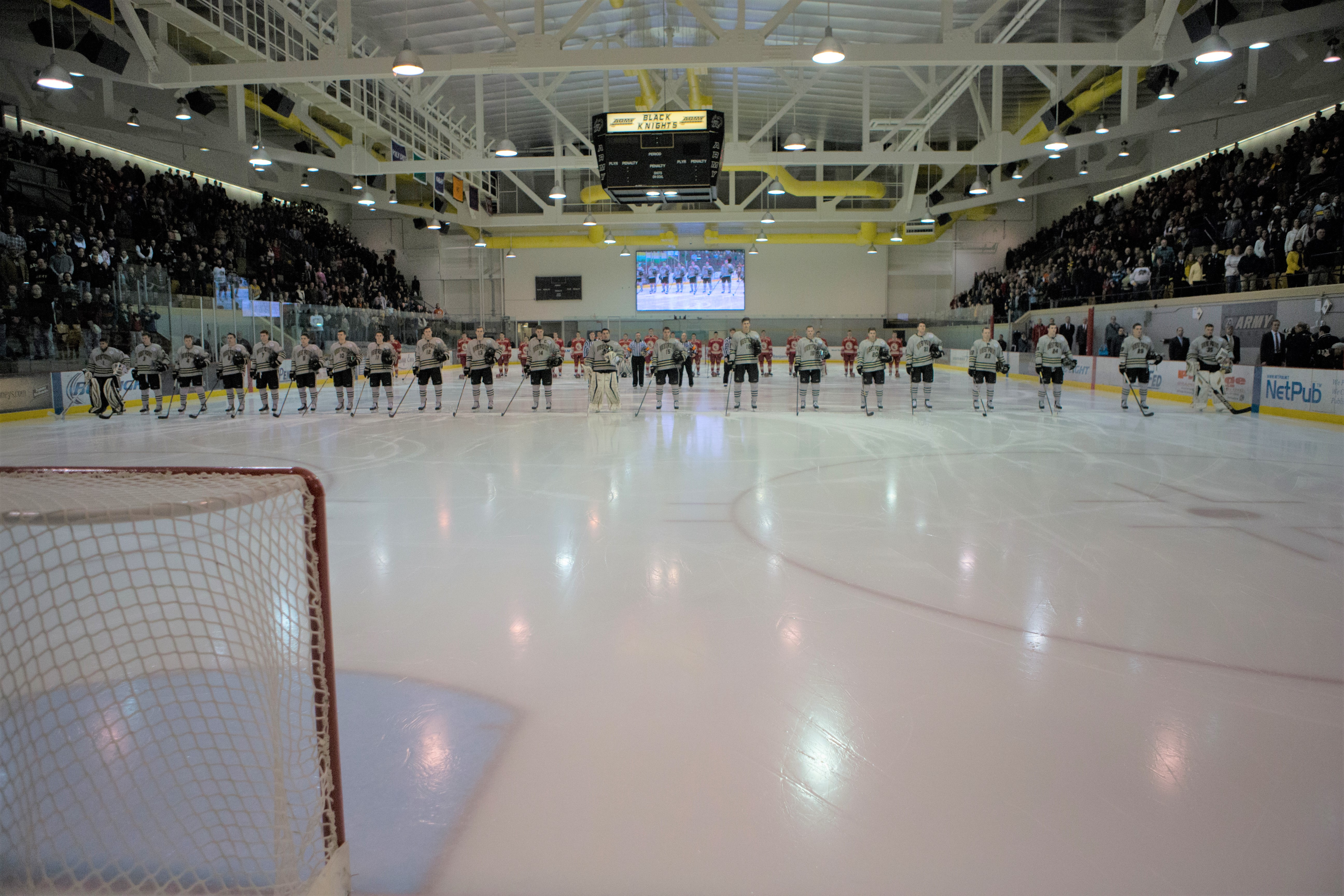
- Tate Rink before a hockey game in 2015
- Interactive map of Tate Rink
- Owner: U.S. Military Academy
- Operator: U.S. Military Academy
- Capacity: 2,648 (hockey)
- Surface: 200x90 feet (hockey)

Construction
- Opened: October 1, 1985
- Cost: $16 million (entire Holleder Center)

Tenant
- Army Black Knights (men's ice hockey)

Tate Rink is a 2,648-seat hockey rink in West Point, New York. It is home to the men's ice hockey team of the United States Military Academy. It is also home to the Army's youth hockey team, the West Point Jr. Black Knights. It was built in as part of the Major Donald W. Holleder Center athletic complex, which also includes Christl Arena. Army's first game in the arena was October 25, 1985, a 5–0 win over Ryerson Polytechnical Institute (now Toronto Metropolitan University) of Toronto. The first goal scored in the rink was by West Point plebe Vincent McDermott of Braintree, Massachusetts who also scored the second goal that evening. The arena is named for the Tate brothers, Joseph S. Tate '41 and Frederic H.S. Tate '42, who were both pilots killed in combat in World War II. Maj. Don Holleder '56, the namesake of the complex, was an All-American football and basketball player killed in action in Vietnam in 1967.

Before the Holleder Center was built, the Black Knights hockey team used the open-air Smith Rink, which was across Mills Road, where the James K. Herbert Alumni Center now stands. The surface size of the rink is 200-by-90 feet.
