= 2021–22 RIT Tigers men's ice hockey season =

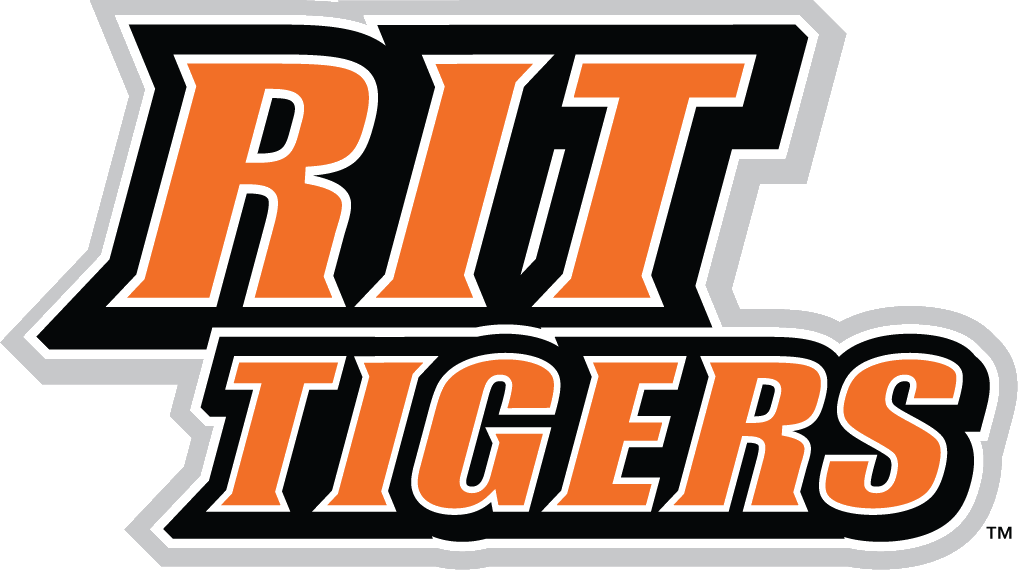
- Conference: 4th Atlantic Hockey
- Home ice: Gene Polisseni Center

Rankings
- USCHO: NR
- USA Today: NR

Record
- Overall: 18–16–4
- Conference: 12–10–4
- Home: 8–8–2
- Road: 9–7–2
- Neutral: 1–1–0

Coaches and captains
- Head coach: Wayne Wilson
- Assistant coaches: Brian Hills; David Insalaco; Len Perno
- Captain(s): Will Calverley; Dan Willett
- Alternate captain(s): Nick Bruce; Andrew Petrucci; Kobe Walker

The 2021–22 RIT Tigers men's ice hockey season was the 58th season of play for the program, the 17th at the Division I level, and the 16th season in the Atlantic Hockey conference. The Tigers represented the Rochester Institute of Technology and were coached by Wayne Wilson, in his 23rd season.

== Season ==
At the start of the season, Wayne Wilson was just 9 wins shy of reaching 400 for his career. RIT shot out of the gate, trying to get their coach to that mark as quickly as they could. The team's good start, which included a surprising win over ranked Notre Dame, got Wilson to the milestone in late November and had the Tigers well positioned in Atlantic Hockey.

Unfortunately, the winter break and COVID-19 delays combined to stop all of the team's momentum as RIT played just two games (both losses) over the succeeding 6 weeks. A pair of poor stretches in January and February dropped the team down around the .500 mark and saw the Tigers' switch starting goaltenders from Kolby Matthews to Frehshman, Tommy Scarfone. Scarfone had a tough beginning to his college career, allowing 6 goals in his first start (albeit on 45 shots), but made the most of his opportunities afterwards.

Despite being outscored by a fair margin during the season, RIT's 4th-place finish gave the team a home date for the conference quarterfinals and the Tigers were able to use that advantage to give them a narrow 2–1 series win over Sacred Heart. In their semifinal game, the Tigers answered goals from Air Force on three separate occasions but could not equal the score a fourth time and lost the game 3–4.

== Departures ==
Player	Position	Nationality	Cause
Logan Drackett	Goaltender	Canada	Graduation (signed with Jacksonville Icemen)
Alden Dupuis	Forward	Canada	Graduation (signed with Morinville Kings)
Regan Seiferling	Defenseman	Canada	Graduation (retired)
Bryson Traptow	Forward	Canada	Graduation (retired)

== Recruiting ==
Player	Position	Nationality	Age	Notes
Tanner Andrew	Forward	Canada	21	Virden, MB
Gianfranco Cassaro	Defenseman	Canada	22	Nobleton, ON; transfer from Massachusetts
Grady Hobbs	Forward	Canada	21	Deloraine, MB
Evan Miller	Forward	Canada	21	Niagara-on-the-Lake, ON
Tommy Scarfone	Goaltender	Canada	20	L'Île-Bizard, QC
Doug Scott	Defenseman	Canada	21	North Vancouver, BC
Carter Wilkie	Forward/Defenseman	Canada	21	Calgary, AB

== Roster ==
As of September 7, 2021.

No.	Nat.	Player	Class	Pos	Height	Weight	DoB	Hometown	Previous team	NHL rights
1	(Canada)	Ian Andriano	Senior	G	6' 1" (1.85 m)	198 lb (90 kg)	1996-08-11	Barrie, Ontario	Ottawa Jr. Senators (CCHL)	—
2	(United States)	Diarmad DiMurro	Sophomore	D	5' 8" (1.73 m)	175 lb (79 kg)	1999-05-02	Highland Mills, New York	Trail Smoke Eaters (BCHL)	—
3	(Canada)	Spencer Berry	Senior	D	6' 1" (1.85 m)	178 lb (81 kg)	1998-09-26	White Rock, British Columbia	Langley Rivermen (BCHL)	—
4	(Canada)	Dimitri Mikrogiannakis	Sophomore	D	5' 11" (1.8 m)	186 lb (84 kg)	1999-09-20	Aurora, Ontario	Cowichan Valley Capitals (BCHL)	—
5	(United States)	Dan Willett (C)	Senior	D	5' 6" (1.68 m)	180 lb (82 kg)	1996-02-23	Bayville, New York	Bloomington Thunder (USHL)	—
6	(United States)	Calvon Boots	Junior	D	5' 10" (1.78 m)	193 lb (88 kg)	1998-02-11	Fairbanks, Alaska	American International (AHA)	—
7	(Canada)	Tanner Andrew	Freshman	F	5' 9" (1.75 m)	170 lb (77 kg)	2000-02-11	Virden, Manitoba	Chilliwack Chiefs (BCHL)	—
8	(Canada)	Will Calverley (C)	Senior	F	5' 9" (1.75 m)	176 lb (80 kg)	1998-07-17	Scarborough, Ontario	Chilliwack Chiefs (BCHL)	—
9	(Canada)	Jake Joffe	Senior	F	5' 10" (1.78 m)	175 lb (79 kg)	1998-04-30	Toronto, Ontario	Toronto Jr. Canadiens (OJHL)	—
10	(Canada)	Gianfranco Cassaro	Junior	D	5' 11" (1.8 m)	186 lb (84 kg)	1999-03-30	Nobleton, Ontario	Massachusetts (HEA)	—
11	(Canada)	Colton Trumbla	Junior	F	6' 1" (1.85 m)	202 lb (92 kg)	1998-11-30	Winnipeg, Manitoba	St. Michael's Buzzers (OJHL)	—
14	(United States)	Jake Hamacher	Senior	F	5' 8" (1.73 m)	183 lb (83 kg)	1997-04-20	Corona, California	Dubuque Fighting Saints (USHL)	—
15	(Canada)	Andrew Rinaldi	Junior	F	6' 0" (1.83 m)	194 lb (88 kg)	1998-03-15	Pierrefonds, Quebec	Wellington Dukes (OJHL)	—
16	(Canada)	Elijah Gonsalves	Junior	F	5' 9" (1.75 m)	173 lb (78 kg)	2000-03-08	Scarborough, Ontario	Wellington Dukes (OJHL)	—
17	(Canada)	Evan Miller	Freshman	F	5' 11" (1.8 m)	175 lb (79 kg)	2000-03-07	Niagara-on-the-Lake, Ontario	Wellington Dukes (OJHL)	—
18	(Canada)	Kobe Walker (A)	Senior	F	5' 9" (1.75 m)	173 lb (78 kg)	1998-04-03	Lloydminster, Alberta	Lloydminster Bobcats (AJHL)	—
19	(Canada)	Nick Bruce (A)	Senior	F	6' 0" (1.83 m)	181 lb (82 kg)	1996-09-02	Fall River, Nova Scotia	Johnstown Tomahawks (NAHL)	—
20	(United States)	Caleb Moretz	Junior	F	5' 10" (1.78 m)	182 lb (83 kg)	1998-07-14	Fairbanks, Alaska	Flin Flon Bombers (SJHL)	—
21	(Canada)	Carter Wilkie	Freshman	F	6' 1" (1.85 m)	190 lb (86 kg)	2000-04-03	Calgary, Alberta	West Kelowna Warriors (BCHL)	—
22	(Canada)	Grady Hobbs	Freshman	F	5' 8" (1.73 m)	177 lb (80 kg)	2000-03-18	Deloraine, Manitoba	Dauphin Kings (MJHL)	—
23	(Canada)	Aiden Hansen-Bukata	Sophomore	D	6' 0" (1.83 m)	179 lb (81 kg)	1999-06-29	Delta, British Columbia	Nanaimo Clippers (BCHL)	—
24	(Canada)	Ryan Nicholson	Junior	D	6' 2" (1.88 m)	196 lb (89 kg)	1999-01-13	Mississauga, Ontario	Oakville Blades (OJHL)	—
25	(Canada)	Doug Scott	Freshman	D	5' 10" (1.78 m)	190 lb (86 kg)	2000-04-16	North Vancouver, British Columbia	Humboldt Broncos (SJHL)	—
26	(Canada)	Cody Laskosky	Sophomore	F	5' 11" (1.8 m)	175 lb (79 kg)	1999-06-21	New Norway, Alberta	Camrose Kodiaks (AJHL)	—
27	(Canada)	Andrew Petrucci (A)	Senior	F	6' 1" (1.85 m)	201 lb (91 kg)	1997-05-21	Toronto, Ontario	Toronto Patriots (OJHL)	—
28	(Canada)	Merritt Oszytko	Senior	F	6' 2" (1.88 m)	182 lb (83 kg)	1998-02-21	Edmonton, Alberta	Fort McMurray Oil Barons (AJHL)	—
30	(Canada)	Tommy Scarfone	Freshman	G	6' 0" (1.83 m)	170 lb (77 kg)	2000-11-19	Montreal, Quebec	Surrey Eagles (BCHL)	—
32	(Canada)	Daniel Chenard	Sophomore	G	5' 11" (1.8 m)	173 lb (78 kg)	1999-10-03	Waterloo, Ontario	Wenatchee Wild (BCHL)	—
40	(Canada)	Kolby Matthews	Junior	G	6' 0" (1.83 m)	170 lb (77 kg)	1999-03-04	Coquitlam, British Columbia	Coquitlam Express (BCHL)	—

== Standings ==
2021–22 Atlantic Hockey Standings
	Conference record										Overall record					
	GP	W	L	T	OW	OL	SW	PTS	GF	GA	GP	W	L	T	GF	GA
#18 American International †*	26	17	7	2	1	2	0	54	97	61	38	22	13	3	134	95
Canisius	26	13	11	2	2	1	1	43	76	67	35	16	16	3	99	97
Army	26	12	11	3	0	1	2	42	75	68	35	14	17	4	98	100
RIT	26	12	10	4	1	3	3	41	69	82	38	18	16	4	92	115
Sacred Heart	26	11	12	3	0	1	3	40	72	70	37	15	18	4	95	100
Air Force	26	11	12	3	3	2	2	37	76	80	36	16	17	3	99	127
Mercyhurst	26	10	12	4	0	1	1	36	75	79	39	16	19	4	114	129
Niagara	26	10	13	3	2	2	1	34	70	79	36	11	22	3	82	122
Bentley	26	10	14	2	1	2	1	34	70	78	36	14	20	2	94	117
Holy Cross	26	10	14	2	3	0	0	29	56	72	37	12	23	2	77	108
Championship: March 19, 2022 † indicates conference regular season champion * indicates conference tournament champion (Riley Trophy); Rankings: USCHO.com Top 20 Poll

== Schedule and results ==
Date	Time	Opponent^{#}	Rank^{#}	Site	TV	Decision	Result	Attendance	Record
Regular season
October 2	7:05 PM	Colgate*		Gene Polisseni Center • Henrietta, New York		Andriano	L 2–5	3,176	0–1–0
October 8	7:05 PM	at Army		Tate Rink • West Point, New York		Matthews	W 4–3	1,132	1–1–0 (1–0–0)
October 9	4:05 PM	at Army		Tate Rink • West Point, New York		Matthews	T 2–2 ^{SOL}	1,279	1–1–1 (1–0–1)
October 16	7:05 PM	St. Lawrence*		Blue Cross Arena • Rochester, New York		Matthews	W 2–1	6,753	2–1–1
October 21	7:05 PM	at #13 Notre Dame*		Compton Family Ice Arena • Notre Dame, Indiana	NBCSRN, SNY	Matthews	W 3–2 ^{OT}	2,283	3–1–1
October 22	7:05 PM	at #13 Notre Dame*		Compton Family Ice Arena • Notre Dame, Indiana	NBCSRN, SNY	Scarfone	L 0–6	3,779	3–2–1
October 29	7:05 PM	Mercyhurst		Gene Polisseni Center • Henrietta, New York		Matthews	T 3–3 ^{SOW}	2,222	3–2–2 (1–0–2)
October 30	5:05 PM	Mercyhurst		Gene Polisseni Center • Henrietta, New York		Matthews	W 3–1	1,718	4–2–2 (2–0–2)
November 6	5:05 PM	at American International		MassMutual Center • Springfield, Massachusetts		Matthews	L 3–7	306	4–3–2 (2–1–2)
November 7	3:05 PM	at American International		MassMutual Center • Springfield, Massachusetts		Matthews	W 3–2 ^{OT}	180	5–3–2 (3–1–2)
November 12	6:05 PM	at Canisius		LECOM Harborcenter • Buffalo, New York		Matthews	L 2–5	537	5–4–2 (3–2–2)
November 13	4:05 PM	at Canisius		LECOM Harborcenter • Buffalo, New York		Matthews	L 1–4	582	5–5–2 (3–3–2)
November 19	7:05 PM	Holy Cross		Gene Polisseni Center • Henrietta, New York		Matthews	W 3–2	2,027	6–5–2 (4–3–2)
November 20	5:05 PM	Holy Cross		Gene Polisseni Center • Henrietta, New York		Matthews	W 4–3	1,853	7–5–2 (5–3–2)
November 26	7:00 PM	at Princeton*		Hobey Baker Memorial Rink • Princeton, New Jersey	ESPN+	Matthews	W 5–4	1,200	8–5–2
November 27	7:00 PM	at Princeton*		Hobey Baker Memorial Rink • Princeton, New Jersey	ESPN+	Scarfone	W 1–0 ^{OT}	1,205	9–5–2
December 11	5:05 PM	Army		Gene Polisseni Center • Henrietta, New York		Matthews	L 0–6	2,213	9–6–2 (5–4–2)
December 12	5:05 PM	Army		Gene Polisseni Center • Henrietta, New York		Scarfone	L 3–4	1,269	9–7–2 (5–5–2)
January 11	4:05 PM	at Sacred Heart		Webster Bank Arena • Bridgeport, Connecticut		Matthews	W 3–2	179	10–7–2 (6–5–2)
January 14	7:05 PM	Arizona State*		Gene Polisseni Center • Henrietta, New York		Scarfone	L 1–2	1,523	10–8–2
January 15	5:05 PM	Arizona State*		Gene Polisseni Center • Henrietta, New York		Matthews	L 1–5	2,308	10–9–2
January 21	7:05 PM	Niagara		Gene Polisseni Center • Henrietta, New York		Scarfone	L 3–5	2,389	10–10–2 (6–6–2)
January 22	7:05 PM	at Niagara		Dwyer Arena • Lewiston, New York		Matthews	W 6–5 ^{OT}	713	11–10–2 (7–6–2)
January 28	7:05 PM	at Bentley		Bentley Arena • Waltham, Massachusetts		Scarfone	W 2–1	897	12–10–2 (8–6–2)
January 30	2:05 PM	at Bentley		Bentley Arena • Waltham, Massachusetts		Matthews	T 3–3 ^{SOW}	780	12–10–3 (8–6–3)
February 1	2:00 PM	vs. Sacred Heart		Tate Rink • West Point, New York		Scarfone	W 5–1	0	13–10–3 (9–6–3)
February 4	7:05 PM	American International		Gene Polisseni Center • Henrietta, New York		Matthews	L 0–7	1,786	13–11–3 (9–7–3)
February 5	7:05 PM	American International		Gene Polisseni Center • Henrietta, New York		Scarfone	T 4–4 ^{SOW}	2,200	13–11–4 (9–7–4)
February 11	7:05 PM	at Mercyhurst		Mercyhurst Ice Center • Erie, Pennsylvania		Scarfone	L 0–1	758	13–12–4 (9–8–4)
February 12	7:05 PM	at Mercyhurst		Mercyhurst Ice Center • Erie, Pennsylvania		Scarfone	L 2–4	812	13–13–4 (9–9–4)
February 18	7:05 PM	at Niagara		Dwyer Arena • Lewiston, New York		Scarfone	W 4–2	836	14–13–4 (10–9–4)
February 19	7:05 PM	Niagara		Gene Polisseni Center • Henrietta, New York		Scarfone	W 3–2	3,012	15–13–4 (11–9–4)
February 25	9:05 PM	at Air Force		Cadet Ice Arena • Colorado Springs, Colorado		Scarfone	W 3–2 ^{OT}	1,401	16–13–4 (12–9–4)
February 26	7:05 PM	at Air Force		Cadet Ice Arena • Colorado Springs, Colorado		Scarfone	L 0–1 ^{OT}	1,465	16–14–4 (12–10–4)
Atlantic Hockey Tournament
March 11	7:00 PM	Sacred Heart*		Gene Polisseni Center • Henrietta, New York (Quarterfinal game 1)		Scarfone	W 1–0 ^{OT}	1,104	17–14–4
March 12	7:00 PM	Sacred Heart*		Gene Polisseni Center • Henrietta, New York (Quarterfinal game 2)		Scarfone	L 1–3	1,195	17–15–4
March 13	5:00 PM	Sacred Heart*		Gene Polisseni Center • Henrietta, New York (Quarterfinal game 3)		Scarfone	W 3–1	805	18–15–4
RIT Won Series 2–1
March 18	7:35 PM	vs. Air Force*		Adirondack Bank Center • Utica, New York (Semifinal)		Scarfone	L 3–4	1,072	18–16–4
*Non-conference game. ^{#}Rankings from USCHO.com Poll. All times are in Eastern Time. Source:

== Scoring Statistics ==
Name	Position	Games	Goals	Assists	Points	PIM
Carter Wilkie	F/D	38	13	17	30	4
Will Calverley	C	38	15	12	27	12
Jake Hamacher	LW	37	9	12	21	19
Kobe Walker	F	29	11	8	19	12
Dan Willett	D	38	5	13	18	24
Grady Hobbs	LW/RW	38	7	7	14	14
Nick Bruce	F	36	6	8	14	31
Aiden Hansen-Bukata	D	38	2	11	13	10
Andrew Rinaldi	LW	37	6	5	11	39
Cody Laskosky	F	32	3	8	11	22
Jake Joffe	RW	34	5	4	9	10
Gianfranco Cassaro	D	38	3	5	8	29
Elijah Gonsalves	C/RW	15	2	4	6	8
Caleb Moretz	C/RW	38	1	5	6	16
Dimitri Mikrogiannakis	D	36	1	4	5	33
Tanner Andrew	C	29	1	3	4	0
Ryan Nicholson	D	36	0	4	4	45
Spencer Berry	D	38	0	3	3	34
Andrew Petrucci	C	35	1	1	2	8
Diarmad DiMurro	D	11	1	0	1	2
Evan Miller	C	2	0	1	1	2
Colton Trumbla	LW	13	0	1	1	4
Ian Andriano	G	2	0	0	0	0
Calvon Boots	D	4	0	0	0	2
Merritt Oszytko	F	7	0	0	0	7
Kolby Matthews	G	19	0	0	0	0
Thomas Scarfone	G	20	0	0	0	0
Doug Scott	D	23	0	0	0	32
Total			92	136	228	452

== Goaltending statistics ==
Name	Games	Minutes	Wins	Losses	Ties	Goals against	Saves	Shut outs	SV %	GAA
Tommy Scarfone	20	1169	8	9	1	48	545	2	.919	2.46
Kolby Matthews	19	1055	10	6	3	61	483	0	.888	3.47
Ian Andriano	2	80	0	1	0	5	30	0	.857	3.75
Empty Net	-	15	-	-	-	1	-	-	-	-
Total	38	2318	18	16	4	115	1058	2	.902	2.98

== Rankings ==
Poll	Week																									
Poll	Pre	1	2	3	4	5	6	7	8	9	10	11	12	13	14	15	16	17	18	19	20	21	22	23	24	25 (Final)
USCHO.com	NR	NR	NR	NR	NR	NR	NR	NR	NR	NR	NR	NR	NR	NR	NR	NR	NR	NR	NR	NR	NR	NR	NR	NR	-	NR
USA Today	NR	NR	NR	NR	NR	NR	NR	NR	NR	NR	NR	NR	NR	NR	NR	NR	NR	NR	NR	NR	NR	NR	NR	NR	NR	NR

Note: USCHO did not release a poll in week 24.

== Awards and honors ==
Player	Award	Ref
Carter Wilkie	Atlantic Hockey Rookie of the Year	
Will Calverley	Atlantic Hockey First Team	
Tommy Scarfone	Atlantic Hockey Rookie Team	
Carter Wilkie	Atlantic Hockey Rookie Team	
