= 2021–22 Mercyhurst Lakers men's ice hockey season =

- Conference: 7th Atlantic Hockey
- Home ice: Mercyhurst Ice Center

Rankings
- USCHO: NR
- USA Today: NR

Record
- Overall: 16–19–4
- Conference: 10–12–4
- Home: 7–5–3
- Road: 9–11–1
- Neutral: 0–3–0

Coaches and captains
- Head coach: Rick Gotkin
- Assistant coaches: Greg Gardner; Matt Nicholson; Ryan Zapolski
- Captain(s): Pierce Crawford; Geoff Kitt
- Alternate captain(s): Michael Bevilacqua; Josh McDougall

The 2021–22 Mercyhurst Lakers men's ice hockey season was the 35th season of play for the program, the 23rd at the Division I level, and the 19th season in the Atlantic Hockey conference. The Lakers represented Mercyhurst University and were coached by Rick Gotkin, in his 34th season.

== Season ==
Mercyhurst was hoping to build on an improvement in 2021 with a strong start to their season. Early returns were mixed as the team tied four of their first eight games. Defense was an issue as the Mercyhurst goal was consistently harassed by their opponents to the tune of nearly 34 shots a game. While the team had Hank Johnson and Kyle McClellan share the starting role, neither was able to shine against the constant barrage. The Lakers nearly pulled themselves back up to .500 at the end of November when they earned a surprising split with Ohio State and there was some hope that the team was ready to turn a corner.

Unfortunately, the defensive performance got even worse afterwards and Mercyhurst went 1–10 in their next eleven matches. In that stretch the Lakers allowed no fewer than 3 goals a game and, even when the offense had a good night, their two netminders couldn't keep the puck out of the net.

By the middle of January, the team was at the bottom of the Atlantic Hockey standings and it looked like the Lakers would have to wait for another year. However, Rick Gotkin decided to put his trust in McClellan as the team's starter and the sophomore began to respond with stellar performances by the end of the month. Seemingly overnight, Mercyhurst went from allowing 5 goals a game to surrendering 1. Mercyhurst arrested their downward descent and started winning games, the most surprising coming against conference-leader, American International in mid-February.

The winning came too late for Mercyhurst to finish any higher than 7th, but it did grant the Lakers home ice advantage in the first round of the conference tournament. McLellan continued to be called upon to save the team's season and he responded with two sterling efforts, winning consecutive 2–1 games while stopping 71 shots. McLellan then backstopped Mercyhurst to an upset over the #2 seed, Canisius; while he got a bit more help from the Laker offense in terms of shots, he still needed to make every save as both games were essentially 2–1 matches (Mercyhurst scored an empty-net goal in the second game).

Mercyhurst managed to lift itself into the conference semifinal and continued to play strong, putting a scare into American International. The Lakers twice took the lead in the game but a hat-trick from AIC's Blake Bennett erased both leads. The Lakers were forced to pull McLellan to try and tie the game but the Yellow Jackets ended up netting a 5th goal as a result. That marker proved critical after Mercyhurst answered with 80 seconds to play but they could not even the score and saw their tremendous postseason run end.

== Departures ==
Player	Position	Nationality	Cause
Khristian Acosta	Forward	United States	Transferred to Utica
Justin Cmunt	Forward	United States	Transferred to Geneseo State
Jac Lymn	Goaltender	United States	Joined club team
Devon Mussio	Defenseman	Canada	Transferred to Skidmore
Brendan Schneider	Forward	Canada	Left program (retired)
Dante Spagnuolo	Forward	Canada	Mid-season transfer to Adrian
Ashton Stockie	Forward	Canada	Signed Professional Contract (HCB Ticino Rockets)
Quinn Wichers	Defenseman	Canada	Graduation (signed with Rapid City Rush)

== Recruiting ==
Player	Position	Nationality	Age	Notes
Jake Beaune	Defenseman	United States	21	Livonia, MI
Mickey Burns	Forward	United States	21	Wayne, NJ; transfer from Vermont
Pierce Crawford	Forward	United States	24	Park Ridge, IL; graduate transfer from Notre Dame
Garrett Dahm	Forward	United States	21	Swansea, IL
Kyler Head	Forward	United States	22	Malone, NY; transfer from Robert Morris
Philip Waugh	Forward/Defenseman	United States	21	McLean, VA; already completed one year of classes

== Roster ==
As of August 23, 2021.

No.	Nat.	Player	Class	Pos	Height	Weight	DoB	Hometown	Previous team	NHL rights
1	(United States)	Matt Lenz	Sophomore	G	5' 11" (1.8 m)	170 lb (77 kg)	1999-06-02	Grapevine, Texas	Steinbach Pistons (MJHL)	—
2	(United States)	Philip Waugh	Sophomore	F	6' 4" (1.93 m)	217 lb (98 kg)	2000-01-10	McLean, Virginia	P.A.L. Jr. Islanders (NCDC)	—
3	(United States)	Jake Beaune	Freshman	D	6' 3" (1.91 m)	195 lb (88 kg)	2000-06-13	Livonia, Michigan	Lincoln Stars (USHL)	—
5	(Canada)	Cade Townend	Junior	D	6' 1" (1.85 m)	200 lb (91 kg)	1999-06-17	Carleton Place, Ontario	Carleton Place Canadians (CCHL)	—
5	(United States)	Michael Bevilacqua (A)	Senior	D	6' 1" (1.85 m)	210 lb (95 kg)	1997-05-07	Hamburg, New York	Green Bay Gamblers (USHL)	—
6	(United States)	Carson Brière	Sophomore	F	5' 9" (1.75 m)	165 lb (75 kg)	1999-09-23	Philadelphia, Pennsylvania	Trail Smoke Eaters (BCHL)	—
7	(Canada)	Devon Daniels	Senior	D	6' 1" (1.85 m)	185 lb (84 kg)	1998-04-28	Thunder Bay, Ontario	Ottawa Jr. Senators (CCHL)	—
8	(Canada)	Owen Norton	Senior	D	5' 9" (1.75 m)	161 lb (73 kg)	1998-06-19	Ancaster, Ontario	Surrey Eagles (BCHL)	—
10	(Canada)	Geoff Kitt (C)	Senior	F	6' 3" (1.91 m)	195 lb (88 kg)	1997-02-09	Dryden, Ontario	Carleton Place Canadians (CCHL)	—
11	(United States)	Steven Ipri	Senior	F	5' 11" (1.8 m)	155 lb (70 kg)	1998-03-13	Broadview Heights, Ohio	Lone Star Brahmas (NAHL)	—
12	(United States)	Austin Heidemann	Sophomore	F	6' 0" (1.83 m)	190 lb (86 kg)	1999-06-27	Maple Grove, Minnesota	Sioux City Musketeers (USHL)	—
13	(United States)	Paul Maust	Junior	F	5' 10" (1.78 m)	170 lb (77 kg)	1998-06-24	Butler, Pennsylvania	Green Bay Gamblers (USHL)	—
14	(United States)	Gueorgui Feduolov	Junior	F	5' 9" (1.75 m)	195 lb (88 kg)	1998-12-10	Mentor, Ohio	Shreveport Mudbugs (NAHL)	—
15	(Canada)	Dante Spagnuolo	Junior	F	5' 11" (1.8 m)	178 lb (81 kg)	1998-09-04	Newmarket, Ontario	North York Rangers (OJHL)	—
16	(Canada)	Wyatt Head	Sophomore	D	6' 1" (1.85 m)	180 lb (82 kg)	1999-03-28	Kelowna, British Columbia	Coquitlam Express (BCHL)	—
18	(United States)	Dalton Hunter	Senior	F	6' 3" (1.91 m)	210 lb (95 kg)	1997-09-26	Greensburg, Pennsylvania	Dubuque Fighting Saints (USHL)	—
19	(United States)	Garrett Dahm	Freshman	F	6' 1" (1.85 m)	175 lb (79 kg)	2000-06-29	Belleville, Illinois	Youngstown Phantoms (USHL)	—
20	(Canada)	Keanan Stewart	Sophomore	F	6' 3" (1.91 m)	195 lb (88 kg)	2000-04-29	Elmira, Ontario	Burlington Cougars (OJHL)	—
21	(United States)	Mickey Burns	Sophomore	F	5' 9" (1.75 m)	175 lb (79 kg)	2000-04-03	Wayne, New Jersey	Vermont (HEA)	—
22	(United States)	Kyler Head	Sophomore	F	6' 4" (1.93 m)	210 lb (95 kg)	1999-07-13	Malone, New York	Robert Morris (AHA)	—
23	(United States)	Jonathan Bendorf	Junior	F	6' 0" (1.83 m)	180 lb (82 kg)	1999-02-26	Yardville, New Jersey	Aberdeen Wings (NAHL)	—
24	(United States)	Marko Reifenberger	Sophomore	F	6' 0" (1.83 m)	190 lb (86 kg)	1999-01-19	Hastings, Minnesota	Minnesota Magicians (NAHL)	—
25	(Canada)	Joseph Maziarz	Junior	D	5' 11" (1.8 m)	190 lb (86 kg)	1999-02-23	Waterloo, Ontario	North York Rangers (OJHL)	—
26	(United States)	Pierce Crawford (C)	Graduate	F	5' 9" (1.75 m)	175 lb (79 kg)	1997-06-23	Park Ridge, Illinois	Notre Dame (Big Ten)	—
27	(United States)	Carver Watson	Junior	D	5' 11" (1.8 m)	175 lb (79 kg)	1998-03-03	Appleton, Wisconsin	Vernon Vipers (BCHL)	—
28	(Canada)	Josh McDougall (A)	Senior	D	5' 10" (1.78 m)	187 lb (85 kg)	1998-06-19	Prince Albert, Saskatchewan	Nipawin Hawks (SJHL)	—
29	(United States)	Hank Johnson	Graduate	G	6' 1" (1.85 m)	175 lb (79 kg)	1996-01-10	Minneapolis, Minnesota	Bemidji State (WCHA)	—
31	(United States)	Kyle McClellan	Sophomore	G	6' 1" (1.85 m)	185 lb (84 kg)	1999-03-18	Manchester, Missouri	Omaha Lancers (USHL)	—
34	(United States)	Noah Kane	Sophomore	F	5' 11" (1.8 m)	180 lb (82 kg)	1999-11-27	Buffalo, New York	Maine Nordiques (NAHL)	—
37	(Canada)	Rylee St. Onge	Junior	F	5' 11" (1.8 m)	193 lb (88 kg)	1998-04-22	St. Catharines, Ontario	Alaska Anchorage (WCHA)	—
38	(Canada)	Dante Sheriff	Sophomore	F	5' 11" (1.8 m)	180 lb (82 kg)	1999-08-04	Brampton, Ontario	Austin Bruins (NAHL)	—

== Standings ==
2021–22 Atlantic Hockey Standings
	Conference record										Overall record					
	GP	W	L	T	OW	OL	SW	PTS	GF	GA	GP	W	L	T	GF	GA
#18 American International †*	26	17	7	2	1	2	0	54	97	61	38	22	13	3	134	95
Canisius	26	13	11	2	2	1	1	43	76	67	35	16	16	3	99	97
Army	26	12	11	3	0	1	2	42	75	68	35	14	17	4	98	100
RIT	26	12	10	4	1	3	3	41	69	82	38	18	16	4	92	115
Sacred Heart	26	11	12	3	0	1	3	40	72	70	37	15	18	4	95	100
Air Force	26	11	12	3	3	2	2	37	76	80	36	16	17	3	99	127
Mercyhurst	26	10	12	4	0	1	1	36	75	79	39	16	19	4	114	129
Niagara	26	10	13	3	2	2	1	34	70	79	36	11	22	3	82	122
Bentley	26	10	14	2	1	2	1	34	70	78	36	14	20	2	94	117
Holy Cross	26	10	14	2	3	0	0	29	56	72	37	12	23	2	77	108
Championship: March 19, 2022 † indicates conference regular season champion * indicates conference tournament champion (Riley Trophy); Rankings: USCHO.com Top 20 Poll

== Schedule and results ==
Date	Time	Opponent^{#}	Rank^{#}	Site	TV	Decision	Result	Attendance	Record
Exhibition
October 2	7:35 PM	at Vermont*		Gutterson Fieldhouse • Burlington, Vermont (Exhibition)			L 2–4	0	
Regular Season
October 8	8:00 PM	at #4 Minnesota*		3M Arena at Mariucci • Minneapolis, Minnesota	BSN+	Johnson	L 4–7	6,372	0–1–0
October 9	6:00 PM	at #4 Minnesota*		3M Arena at Mariucci • Minneapolis, Minnesota	BSN	McClellan	L 3–5	6,396	0–2–0
October 15	7:05 PM	Holy Cross		Mercyhurst Ice Center • Erie, Pennsylvania		McClellan	T 4–4 ^{SOW}	813	0–2–1 (0–0–1)
October 16	3:05 PM	Holy Cross		Mercyhurst Ice Center • Erie, Pennsylvania		Johnson	W 5–2	512	1–2–1 (1–0–1)
October 24	5:05 PM	USNTDP*		Mercyhurst Ice Center • Erie, Pennsylvania (Exhibition)			W 7–3		
October 29	7:05 PM	at RIT		Gene Polisseni Center • Henrietta, New York		Johnson	T 3–3 ^{SOL}	2,222	1–2–2 (1–0–2)
October 30	7:05 PM	at RIT		Gene Polisseni Center • Henrietta, New York		McClellan	L 1–3	1,718	1–3–2 (1–1–2)
November 5	7:05 PM	Sacred Heart		Mercyhurst Ice Center • Erie, Pennsylvania		Johnson	T 3–3 ^{SOL}	889	1–3–3 (1–1–3)
November 6	4:05 PM	Sacred Heart		Mercyhurst Ice Center • Erie, Pennsylvania		McClellan	T 3–3 ^{SOL}	697	1–3–4 (1–1–4)
November 12	7:05 PM	at Holy Cross		Hart Center • Worcester, Massachusetts		Johnson	W 3–2	435	2–3–4 (2–1–4)
November 13	5:05 PM	at Holy Cross		Hart Center • Worcester, Massachusetts		McClellan	L 4–5 ^{OT}	302	2–4–4 (2–2–4)
November 19	7:05 PM	Canisius		Mercyhurst Ice Center • Erie, Pennsylvania		Johnson	L 1–6	747	2–5–4 (2–3–4)
November 20	7:00 PM	at Canisius		LECOM Harborcenter • Buffalo, New York		McClellan	W 5–2	502	3–5–4 (3–3–4)
November 26	5:00 PM	at #17 Ohio State*		Value City Arena • Columbus, Ohio		Johnson	W 5–4	3,277	4–5–4
November 27	5:00 PM	at #17 Ohio State*		Value City Arena • Columbus, Ohio		McClellan	L 2–3	2,554	4–6–4
December 3	7:05 PM	at Bentley		Bentley Arena • Waltham, Massachusetts		Johnson	L 3–4	1,131	4–7–4 (3–4–4)
December 4	5:05 PM	at Bentley		Bentley Arena • Waltham, Massachusetts		McClellan	L 1–3	965	4–8–4 (3–5–4)
December 12	3:05 PM	at Miami		Mercyhurst Ice Center • Erie, Pennsylvania		McClellan	L 4–7	858	4–9–4
Ledyard Bank Classic
December 30	4:00 PM	vs. #20 Boston College*		Thompson Arena • Hanover, New Hampshire (Ledyard Bank Semifinal)		Johnson	L 2–4	87	4–10–4
December 31	4:00 PM	vs. New Hampshire*		Thompson Arena • Hanover, New Hampshire (Ledyard Bank Consolation Game)		Johnson	L 1–7	48	4–11–4
January 4	7:05 PM	at Miami*		Steve Cady Arena • Oxford, Ohio		Johnson	W 5–4 ^{OT}	894	5–11–4
January 14	1:05 PM	at American International		MassMutual Center • Springfield, Massachusetts		Johnson	L 4–5	70	5–12–4 (3–6–4)
January 15	1:05 PM	at American International		MassMutual Center • Springfield, Massachusetts		McClellan	L 3–6	79	5–13–4 (3–7–4)
January 21	7:05 PM	Air Force		Mercyhurst Ice Center • Erie, Pennsylvania		McClellan	L 2–5	120	5–14–4 (3–8–4)
January 22	4:05 PM	Air Force		Mercyhurst Ice Center • Erie, Pennsylvania		McClellan	L 3–5	120	5–15–4 (3–9–4)
January 28	7:00 PM	at Niagara		Dwyer Arena • Lewiston, New York		McClellan	W 4–1	638	6–15–4 (4–9–4)
January 29	5:00 PM	at Niagara		Dwyer Arena • Lewiston, New York		McClellan	L 0–1	767	6–16–4 (4–10–4)
February 4	7:05 PM	at Army		Tate Rink • West Point, New York		McClellan	W 4–0	1,238	7–16–4 (5–10–4)
February 5	4:05 PM	at Army		Tate Rink • West Point, New York		McClellan	L 1–5	1,284	7–17–4 (5–11–4)
February 11	7:05 PM	RIT		Mercyhurst Ice Center • Erie, Pennsylvania		McClellan	W 1–0	758	8–17–4 (6–11–4)
February 12	7:05 PM	RIT		Mercyhurst Ice Center • Erie, Pennsylvania		McClellan	W 4–2	812	9–17–4 (7–11–4)
February 18	7:05 PM	American International		Mercyhurst Ice Center • Erie, Pennsylvania		McClellan	L 1–5	1,214	9–18–4 (7–12–4)
February 19	3:05 PM	American International		Mercyhurst Ice Center • Erie, Pennsylvania		McClellan	W 6–3	779	10–18–4 (8–12–4)
February 25	7:00 PM	at Canisius		LECOM Harborcenter • Buffalo, New York		McClellan	W 3–0	732	11–18–4 (9–12–4)
February 26	7:05 PM	Canisius		Mercyhurst Ice Center • Erie, Pennsylvania		McClellan	W 3–1	858	12–18–4 (10–12–4)
Atlantic Hockey Tournament
March 4	7:05 PM	Niagara*		Mercyhurst Ice Center • Erie, Pennsylvania (First Round game 1)		McClellan	W 2–1 ^{OT}	687	13–18–4
March 5	7:05 PM	Niagara*		Mercyhurst Ice Center • Erie, Pennsylvania (First Round game 2)		McClellan	W 2–1	704	14–18–4
March 11	7:00 PM	at Canisius*		LECOM Harborcenter • Buffalo, New York (Quarterfinal game 1)		McClellan	W 2–1 ^{2OT}	513	15–18–4
March 12	7:00 PM	at Canisius*		LECOM Harborcenter • Buffalo, New York (Quarterfinal game 2)		McClellan	W 3–1	443	16–18–4
March 18	4:05 PM	vs. American International*		Adirondack Bank Center • Utica, New York (Semifinal)		McClellan	L 4–5	1,072	16–19–4
*Non-conference game. ^{#}Rankings from USCHO.com Poll. All times are in Eastern Time. Source:

== Scoring statistics ==
Name	Position	Games	Goals	Assists	Points	PIM
Carson Brière	C/RW	31	13	14	27	20
Austin Heidemann	F	38	12	15	27	18
Dante Sheriff	RW	33	8	19	27	43
Rylee St. Onge	LW	36	15	8	23	37
Jonathan Bendorf	LW	36	6	14	20	4
Gueorgui Feduolov	F	36	7	9	16	8
Pierce Crawford	F	38	7	9	16	50
Cade Townend	D	39	7	9	16	37
Josh McDougall	D	39	3	12	15	2
Noah Kane	C	26	5	9	14	8
Owen Norton	D	36	3	10	13	52
Marko Reifenberger	C	32	6	6	12	21
Mickey Burns	LW	23	4	8	12	2
Geoff Kitt	C	35	3	9	12	6
Paul Maust	LW	37	4	6	10	26
Steven Ipri	F	21	3	6	9	41
Devon Daniels	D	38	2	6	8	29
Kyler Head	F	18	3	3	6	11
Jake Beaune	D	35	1	4	5	16
Michael Bevilacqua	D	35	0	4	4	44
Dustin Geregach	D	16	0	3	3	4
Keanan Stewart	F	7	2	0	2	2
Wyatt Head	D	8	0	2	2	6
Garrett Dahm	F	22	0	2	2	8
Dante Spagnuolo	C	3	0	1	1	0
Dalton Hunter	RW	6	0	1	1	6
Philip Waugh	D/F	14	0	1	1	2
Kyle McClellan	G	27	0	1	1	0
Matt Lenz	G	1	0	0	0	0
Hank Johnson	G	13	0	0	0	0
Total			114	192	306	503

== Goaltending statistics ==
Name	Games	Minutes	Wins	Losses	Ties	Goals against	Saves	Shut outs	SV %	GAA
Kyle McClellan	27	1616	12	13	2	69	939	3	.932	2.56
Hank Johnson	13	741	4	6	2	54	369	0	.872	4.37
Matt Lenz	1	9:56	0	0	0	1	8	0	.889	6.04
Empty Net	-	12	-	-	-	5	-	-	-	-
Total	39	2389	16	19	4	129	1316	3	.911	3.24

== Rankings ==
Poll	Week																									
Poll	Pre	1	2	3	4	5	6	7	8	9	10	11	12	13	14	15	16	17	18	19	20	21	22	23	24	25 (Final)
USCHO.com	NR	NR	NR	NR	NR	NR	NR	NR	NR	NR	NR	NR	NR	NR	NR	NR	NR	NR	NR	NR	NR	NR	NR	NR	-	NR
USA Today	NR	NR	NR	NR	NR	NR	NR	NR	NR	NR	NR	NR	NR	NR	NR	NR	NR	NR	NR	NR	NR	NR	NR	NR	NR	NR

Note: USCHO did not release a poll in week 24.

== Awards and honors ==
Player	Award	Ref
Carson Brière	Atlantic Hockey Third Team	
