= 2021–22 Niagara Purple Eagles men's ice hockey season =

- Conference: T–8th Atlantic Hockey
- Home ice: Dwyer Arena

Rankings
- USCHO: NR
- USA Today: NR

Record
- Overall: 11–22–2
- Conference: 10–13–3
- Home: 6–8–2
- Road: 5–14–1

Coaches and captains
- Head coach: Jason Lammers
- Assistant coaches: Ian Burt; John Lidgett; Mark Phalon
- Captain: Chris Harpur
- Alternate captain(s): Jon Hill; Walker Sommer; Jack Zielinski

The 2021–22 Niagara Purple Eagles men's ice hockey season was the 26th season of play for the program, the 24th at the Division I level, and the 12th season in the Atlantic Hockey conference. The Purple Eagles represented Niagara University and were coached by Jason Lammers, in his 5th season.

== Season ==
Niagara didn't have much to celebrate during the season. For most of the year they were near the bottom of the conference standings and were among the worst in terms of both goals scored and goals allowed. However, the Eagles did show flashes of strong play and posted one of the program's best wins when they defeated #10 Notre Dame after Christmas.

In the final week of the regular season, the team managed to take down conference champion American International in a shootout. When they entered the postseason they were set against Bentley, who had gone winless in their previous eleven games. Unfortunately, Niagara dropped both games at home and saw their season come to an abrupt end.

== Departures ==
Player	Position	Nationality	Cause
Jack Billings	Forward	United States	Graduation (signed with Iowa Heartlanders)
Jared Brandt	Defenseman	United States	Graduation (signed with Reading Royals)
Cameron Cook	Forward	Canada	Signed professional contract (Evansville Thunderbolts)
Eric Cooley	Forward	United States	Graduate transfer to Ohio State
Croix Evingson	Defenseman	United States	Graduation (signed with Jacksonville Icemen)
Justin Kendall	Forward	United States	Graduation (retired)
Dylan Mills	Forward	United States	Signed professional contract (Evansville Thunderbolts)
Scott Persson	Defenseman	Sweden	Joined club team
Trevor Poeze	Forward	Canada	Left program (retired)
Patrick Pugliese	Goaltender	United States	Transferred to Trinity
Reed Robinson	Forward	United States	Left program (retired)
Ludwig Stenlund	Forward	Sweden	Signed professional contract (HC Vita Hästen)
Alex Truscott	Forward	United States	Left program (retired)
Brian Wilson	Goaltender	Canada	Graduation (signed with Evansville Thunderbolts)

== Recruiting ==
Player	Position	Nationality	Age	Notes
Jason Ahearn	Forward	United States	20	Staten Island, NY
Noah Carlin	Defenseman	United States	21	Marine City, MI
Jack DeBoer	Forward	United States	21	Madison, NJ; transfer from Boston University
Mike Faulkner	Defenseman	United States	25	The Bronx, NY; graduate transfer from Hobart
Olivier Gauthier	Forward	Canada	22	Ferme-Neuve, QC; transfer from Alaska Anchorage
Zane Kindrachuk	Forward	Canada	21	Calgary, AB
Albin Nilsson	Forward	Sweden	23	Ljungby, SWE; transfer from Providence
Shane Ott	Forward	United States	21	Centennial, CO
Lars Christian Rødne	Forward	Norway	21	Stavanger, NOR
Alexandre Roy	Defenseman	United States	23	Saint-Vallier, QC; transfer from Omaha
Jake Sibell	Goaltender	United States	21	Isanti, MN

== Roster ==
As of September 6, 2021.

No.	Nat.	Player	Class	Pos	Height	Weight	DoB	Hometown	Previous team	NHL rights
2	(Canada)	Jesse Pomeroy	Sophomore	D	6' 2" (1.88 m)	190 lb (86 kg)	1999-05-25	Prince George, British Columbia	Drayton Valley Thunder (AJHL)	—
3	(Canada)	Alexandre Roy	Junior	D	6' 7" (2.01 m)	216 lb (98 kg)	1998-09-21	Saint-Vallier, Quebec	Omaha (NCHC)	—
4	(Canada)	Chris Harpur (C)	Graduate	D	6' 3" (1.91 m)	200 lb (91 kg)	1996-09-13	Niagara-on-the-Lake, Ontario	Cowichan Valley Capitals (BCHL)	—
5	(United States)	Noah Carlin	Freshman	D	6' 0" (1.83 m)	174 lb (79 kg)	2000-06-13	Marine City, Michigan	Omaha Lancers (USHL)	—
7	(United States)	Jordan Wishman	Senior	D	6' 1" (1.85 m)	187 lb (85 kg)	1998-11-22	Des Moines, Iowa	Dubuque Fighting Saints (USHL)	—
8	(United States)	Walker Sommer (A)	Senior (RS)	F	5' 9" (1.75 m)	175 lb (79 kg)	1996-04-29	Avon, Ohio	Air Force (AHA)	—
9	(Sweden)	Albin Nilsson	Junior	F	6' 0" (1.83 m)	190 lb (86 kg)	1998-09-18	Ljungby, Sweden	Providence (HEA)	—
10	(United States)	Carter Randklev	Sophomore	F	5' 8" (1.73 m)	163 lb (74 kg)	1999-11-05	Moorhead, Minnesota	Fargo Force (USHL)	—
11	(Canada)	Olivier Gauthier	Sophomore	F	5' 10" (1.78 m)	185 lb (84 kg)	1999-04-09	Ferme-Neuve, Quebec	Alaska Anchorage (WCHA)	—
12	(Canada)	Jason Pineo	Junior	F	6' 2" (1.88 m)	200 lb (91 kg)	1998-02-23	Toronto, Ontario	Oakville Blades (OJHL)	—
13	(United States)	Zac Herrmann	Senior	D	6' 0" (1.83 m)	185 lb (84 kg)	1997-11-06	Lancaster, New York	Odessa Jackalopes (NAHL)	—
14	(United States)	Ryan Naumovski	Junior	F	6' 0" (1.83 m)	150 lb (68 kg)	1999-07-28	Shelby Township, Michigan	New Jersey Titans (NAHL)	—
15	(United States)	Matt Cameron	Sophomore	F	5' 11" (1.8 m)	185 lb (84 kg)	2000-06-08	Berwyn, Pennsylvania	New Jersey Titans (NAHL)	—
16	(Canada)	Zane Kindrachuk	Freshman	F	5' 9" (1.75 m)	161 lb (73 kg)	2000-01-04	Calgary, Alberta	Okotoks Oilers (AJHL)	—
17	(United States)	Luke Edgerton	Senior	F	5' 10" (1.78 m)	180 lb (82 kg)	1997-05-01	Wheeling, West Virginia	Jersey Hitmen (NCDC)	—
18	(United States)	Jay Ahearn	Freshman	F	5' 11" (1.8 m)	170 lb (77 kg)	2001-05-23	Staten Island, New York	Johnstown Tomahawks (NAHL)	—
19	(Canada)	Ryan Cox	Senior	F	5' 11" (1.8 m)	195 lb (88 kg)	1998-07-23	St. Albert, Alberta	Sherwood Park Crusaders (AJHL)	—
20	(United States)	Christian Gorsack	Sophomore	F	5' 11" (1.8 m)	183 lb (83 kg)	2000-06-08	Jeannette, Pennsylvania	Johnstown Tomahawks (NAHL)	—
21	(United States)	Shane Ott	Freshman	F	6' 1" (1.85 m)	181 lb (82 kg)	2000-07-21	Centennial, Colorado	Janesville Jets (NAHL)	—
22	(United States)	Michael Faulkner	Graduate	D	5' 11" (1.8 m)	170 lb (77 kg)	1996-02-25	Bronx, New York	Hobart (NEHC)	—
23	(Norway)	Lars Rødne	Freshman	F	6' 0" (1.83 m)	181 lb (82 kg)	2000-07-22	Stavanager, Norway	Bismarck Bobcats (NAHL)	—
24	(Czech Republic)	Josef Myšák	Sophomore	D	6' 3" (1.91 m)	215 lb (98 kg)	1999-09-08	Litvínov, Czech Republic	Austin Bruins (NAHL)	—
25	(Canada)	Jon Hill (A)	Senior	D	6' 2" (1.88 m)	200 lb (91 kg)	1998-10-09	Whitby, Ontario	Brockville Braves (CCHL)	—
26	(Canada)	Brandon Stanley	Senior	F	6' 2" (1.88 m)	202 lb (92 kg)	1997-05-03	Sioux Lookout, Ontario	Philadelphia Rebels (NAHL)	—
27	(United States)	Jack DeBoer	Senior	F	6' 3" (1.91 m)	187 lb (85 kg)	2000-08-17	Madison, New Jersey	Boston University (HEA)	—
28	(United States)	Jack Zielinski (A)	Graduate	D	6' 2" (1.88 m)	205 lb (93 kg)	1996-08-08	Richmond, Virginia	Lone Star Brahmas (NAHL)	—
30	(United States)	Jake Sibell	Freshman	G	6' 2" (1.88 m)	205 lb (93 kg)	2000-01-03	Isanti, Minnesota	Aberdeen Wings (NAHL)	—
31	(United States)	Chad Veltri	Junior	G	5' 11" (1.8 m)	187 lb (85 kg)	1998-06-03	Pittsburgh, Pennsylvania	Youngstown Phantoms (USHL)	—
35	(United States)	Michael Corson	Senior	G	6' 3" (1.91 m)	195 lb (88 kg)	1999-04-22	Darien, Illinois	Denver (NCHC)	—

== Standings ==
2021–22 Atlantic Hockey Standings
	Conference record										Overall record					
	GP	W	L	T	OW	OL	SW	PTS	GF	GA	GP	W	L	T	GF	GA
#18 American International †*	26	17	7	2	1	2	0	54	97	61	38	22	13	3	134	95
Canisius	26	13	11	2	2	1	1	43	76	67	35	16	16	3	99	97
Army	26	12	11	3	0	1	2	42	75	68	35	14	17	4	98	100
RIT	26	12	10	4	1	3	3	41	69	82	38	18	16	4	92	115
Sacred Heart	26	11	12	3	0	1	3	40	72	70	37	15	18	4	95	100
Air Force	26	11	12	3	3	2	2	37	76	80	36	16	17	3	99	127
Mercyhurst	26	10	12	4	0	1	1	36	75	79	39	16	19	4	114	129
Niagara	26	10	13	3	2	2	1	34	70	79	36	11	22	3	82	122
Bentley	26	10	14	2	1	2	1	34	70	78	36	14	20	2	94	117
Holy Cross	26	10	14	2	3	0	0	29	56	72	37	12	23	2	77	108
Championship: March 19, 2022 † indicates conference regular season champion * indicates conference tournament champion (Riley Trophy); Rankings: USCHO.com Top 20 Poll

== Schedule and results ==
Date	Time	Opponent^{#}	Rank^{#}	Site	TV	Decision	Result	Attendance	Record
Regular season
October 8	8:07 PM	at #8 North Dakota*		Ralph Engelstad Arena • Grand Forks, North Dakota		Veltri	L 2–6	11,386	0–1–0
October 9	7:07 PM	at #8 North Dakota*		Ralph Engelstad Arena • Grand Forks, North Dakota		Sibell	L 0–4	11,689	0–2–0
October 21	7:00 PM	at Penn State*		Pegula Ice Arena • University Park, Pennsylvania		Veltri	L 0–4	5,547	0–3–0
October 22	7:00 PM	at Penn State*		Pegula Ice Arena • University Park, Pennsylvania		Sibell	L 2–6	5,597	0–4–0
October 29	5:35 PM	at Sacred Heart		Webster Bank Arena • Bridgeport, Connecticut		Veltri	W 6–1	413	1–4–0 (1–0–0)
October 30	1:05 PM	at Sacred Heart		Webster Bank Arena • Bridgeport, Connecticut		Sibell	L 1–3	353	1–5–0 (1–1–0)
November 5	7:05 PM	Air Force		Dwyer Arena • Lewiston, New York		Veltri	W 4–3	880	2–5–0 (2–1–0)
November 6	5:05 PM	Air Force		Dwyer Arena • Lewiston, New York		Sibell	T 3–3 ^{SOL}	765	2–5–1 (2–1–1)
November 19	7:00 PM	Army		Dwyer Arena • Lewiston, New York		Veltri	T 3–3 ^{SOW}	437	2–5–2 (2–1–2)
November 20	5:00 PM	Army		Dwyer Arena • Lewiston, New York		Veltri	L 1–4	757	2–6–2 (2–2–2)
November 26	7:30 PM	at #4 Michigan*		Yost Ice Arena • Ann Arbor, Michigan		Sibell	L 1–6	5,800	2–7–2
November 27	7:00 PM	at #4 Michigan*		Yost Ice Arena • Ann Arbor, Michigan		Veltri	L 1–4	5,800	2–8–2
December 3	7:05 PM	at Holy Cross		Hart Center • Worcester, Massachusetts		Veltri	W 3–1	322	3–8–2 (3–2–2)
December 4	7:05 PM	at Holy Cross		Hart Center • Worcester, Massachusetts		Veltri	L 2–3	245	3–9–2 (3–3–2)
December 10	7:00 PM	Canisius		Dwyer Arena • Lewiston, New York		Veltri	L 0–4	1,072	3–10–2 (3–4–2)
December 11	7:00 PM	at Canisius		LECOM Harborcenter • Buffalo, New York		Veltri	W 3–2 ^{OT}	852	4–10–2 (4–4–2)
December 31	6:00 PM	at #10 Notre Dame*		Compton Family Ice Arena • Notre Dame, Indiana	Peacock	Veltri	W 3–1	3,374	5–10–2
January 1	5:00 PM	at #10 Notre Dame*		Compton Family Ice Arena • Notre Dame, Indiana	Peacock	Veltri	L 0–5	2,791	5–11–2
January 7	7:00 PM	Sacred Heart		Dwyer Arena • Lewiston, New York		Veltri	W 5–4 ^{OT}	537	6–11–2 (5–4–2)
January 8	5:00 PM	Sacred Heart		Dwyer Arena • Lewiston, New York		Sibell	L 1–2	538	6–12–2 (5–5–2)
January 14	9:05 PM	at Air Force		Cadet Ice Arena • Colorado Springs, Colorado		Corson	L 4–5	1,157	6–13–2 (5–6–2)
January 15	7:05 PM	at Air Force		Cadet Ice Arena • Colorado Springs, Colorado		Corson	L 2–3	1,456	6–14–2 (5–7–2)
January 21	7:05 PM	at RIT		Gene Polisseni Center • Henrietta, New York		Sibell	W 5–3	2,389	7–14–2 (6–7–2)
January 22	7:05 PM	RIT		Dwyer Arena • Lewiston, New York		Veltri	L 5–6 ^{OT}	713	7–15–2 (6–8–2)
January 28	7:00 PM	Mercyhurst		Dwyer Arena • Lewiston, New York		Sibell	L 1–4	638	7–16–2 (6–9–2)
January 29	5:00 PM	Mercyhurst		Dwyer Arena • Lewiston, New York		Veltri	W 1–0	767	8–16–2 (7–9–2)
February 4	7:00 PM	Bentley		Dwyer Arena • Lewiston, New York		Veltri	W 6–5	611	9–16–2 (8–9–2)
February 5	5:00 PM	Bentley		Dwyer Arena • Lewiston, New York		Veltri	W 3–2	585	10–16–2 (9–9–2)
February 11	7:00 PM	at Canisius		LECOM Harborcenter • Buffalo, New York		Veltri	W 4–1	895	11–16–2 (10–9–2)
February 12	7:00 PM	Canisius		Dwyer Arena • Lewiston, New York		Veltri	L 1–5	854	11–17–2 (10–10–2)
February 18	7:05 PM	RIT		Dwyer Arena • Lewiston, New York		Veltri	L 2–4	836	11–18–2 (10–11–2)
February 19	7:05 PM	at RIT		Gene Polisseni Center • Henrietta, New York		Veltri	L 2–3	3,012	11–19–2 (10–12–2)
February 25	1:05 PM	at American International		MassMutual Center • Springfield, Massachusetts		Veltri	T 1–1 ^{SOW}	93	11–19–3 (10–12–3)
February 26	1:05 PM	at American International		MassMutual Center • Springfield, Massachusetts		Veltri	L 2–3 ^{OT}	262	11–20–3 (10–13–3)
Atlantic Hockey Tournament
March 4	7:00 PM	Bentley*		Dwyer Arena • Lewiston, New York (First Round game 1)		Veltri	L 2–3 ^{OT}	470	11–21–3
March 5	7:00 PM	Bentley*		Dwyer Arena • Lewiston, New York (First Round game 2)		Veltri	L 1–4	447	11–22–3
Niagara Lost Series 0–2
*Non-conference game. ^{#}Rankings from USCHO.com Poll. All times are in Eastern Time. Source:

== Scoring statistics ==
Name	Position	Games	Goals	Assists	Points	PIM
Ryan Naumovski	F	36	7	16	23	2
Albin Nilsson	C	32	8	13	21	16
Ryan Cox	F	36	11	8	19	18
Shane Ott	F	36	8	10	18	8
Chris Harpur	D	35	3	14	17	39
Walker Sommer	C	29	8	7	15	6
Zac Herrmann	D	36	5	10	15	28
Lars Christian Rødne	LW	30	5	6	11	4
Josef Mysak	D	32	2	7	9	18
Carter Randklev	F	22	6	2	8	2
Brandon Stanley	F	33	3	5	8	32
Jason Pineo	C	35	3	5	8	14
Jonathan Hill	D	36	2	6	8	33
Luke Edgerton	F	28	1	7	8	6
Christian Gorscak	F	35	4	3	7	19
Jordan Wishman	D	32	1	6	7	16
Jack Zielinski	D	36	1	6	7	31
Mike Faulkner	D	11	1	5	6	2
Olivier Gauthier	LW	33	1	4	5	10
Jesse Pomeroy	D	28	0	4	4	12
Jack DeBoer	C	21	2	0	2	10
Chad Veltri	G	28	0	1	1	0
Zane Kindrachuk	F	2	0	0	0	0
Mike Corson	G	3	0	0	0	0
Alexandre Roy	D	4	0	0	0	2
Jake Sibell	G	11	0	0	0	0
Noah Carlin	D	22	0	0	0	6
Total			82	145	227	334

== Goaltending statistics ==
Name	Games	Minutes	Wins	Losses	Ties	Goals against	Saves	Shut outs	SV %	GAA
Chad Veltri	29	1569	10	14	2	77	675	1	.898	2.94
Jake Sibell	15	498	1	6	1	32	246	0	.885	3.85
Mike Corson	8	91	0	2	0	6	53	0	.898	3.94
Empty Net	-	33	-	-	-	4	-	-	-	-
Total	36	2193	11	22	3	119	974	1	.891	3.26

== Rankings ==
Poll	Week																									
Poll	Pre	1	2	3	4	5	6	7	8	9	10	11	12	13	14	15	16	17	18	19	20	21	22	23	24	25 (Final)
USCHO.com	NR	NR	NR	NR	NR	NR	NR	NR	NR	NR	NR	NR	NR	NR	NR	NR	NR	NR	NR	NR	NR	NR	NR	NR	-	NR
USA Today	NR	NR	NR	NR	NR	NR	NR	NR	NR	NR	NR	NR	NR	NR	NR	NR	NR	NR	NR	NR	NR	NR	NR	NR	NR	NR

Note: USCHO did not release a poll in week 24.

== Awards and honors ==
Player	Award	Ref
Shane Ott	Atlantic Hockey Rookie Team	
