= 2021–22 Sacred Heart Pioneers men's ice hockey season =

- Conference: 5th Atlantic Hockey
- Home ice: Webster Bank Arena

Rankings
- USCHO: NR
- USA Today: NR

Record
- Overall: 15–18–4
- Conference: 11–12–3
- Home: 6–4–0
- Road: 9–13–4
- Neutral: 0–1–0

Coaches and captains
- Head coach: C. J. Marottolo
- Assistant coaches: Scott McDougall; Craig Height
- Alternate captain: Alex Bates

The 2021–22 Sacred Heart Pioneers men's ice hockey season was the 29th season of play for the program, the 24th at the Division I level, and the 19th season in the Atlantic Hockey conference. The Pioneers represented Sacred Heart University and were coached by C. J. Marottolo, in his 13th season.

== Season ==
Sacred Heart spent the entire season hovering around the .500 mark. The team was effectively average in all aspects of the game; neither their offense nor defense were particularly strong, but both couldn't be called weaknesses either. Over the course of the season, Sacred Heart's longest losing streak was just three games but they weren't able to put together any long stretches of winning hockey. The Pioneers got mostly reliable goaltending from junior Justin Robbins but also buoyed his efforts with stints from both Josh Benson and Luke Lush.

Probably the best performance from the team came in the Connecticut Ice semifinal when they lost to #2 Quinnipiac into overtime. The Pioneers had led late, only to see the Bobcats tie the score after pulling their goalie.

The Pioneers' 5th-place finish in Atlantic Hockey earned them an automatic bid into the conference quarterfinals. Despite outplaying RIT for a majority of the three-game series, Sacred Heart's offense was lacking and scored just once in their two losses.

== Departures ==
Player	Position	Nationality	Cause
Josh Allan	Defenseman	Canada	Graduation (retired)
Derek Contessa	Forward	United States	Transferred to Endicott
Carson Gallagher	Forward	Canada	Transferred to Plattsburgh State
Michael Gilroy	Defenseman	United States	Graduation (retired)
Marcel Godbout	Forward	United States	Graduation (signed with Pensacola Ice Flyers)
Marc Johnstone	Forward	United States	Graduation (signed with South Carolina Stingrays)
Marcus Joseph	Defenseman	United States	Graduation (retired)
Max Luukko	Defenseman	United States	Graduation (retired)
Emil Öhrvall	Forward	Sweden	Signed professional contract (BIK Karlskoga)
David Tomeo	Goaltender	United States	Signed professional contract (Utica Comets)
Evan Wisocky	Forward	United States	Graduation (retired)

== Recruiting ==
Player	Position	Nationality	Age	Notes
Logan Britt	Defenseman	United States	22	Crystal Lake, IL; transfer from Quinnipiac
Troy Conzo	Forward	United States	24	Nesconset, NY; graduate transfer from Colorado College
Daniel Ebrahim	Forward	Canada	21	Brooklin, ON
Dante Fantauzzi	Defenseman	Canada	21	Woodbridge, ON; transfer from Alaska Anchorage
Conner Hutchison	Defenseman	United States	20	Hicksville, NY; transfer from Vermont
Dante Palecco	Forward	United States	23	Whippany, NJ; graduate transfer from Yale
Dakota Raabe	Forward	United States	24	Capistrano Beach, CA; graduate transfer from Michigan
Justin Robbins	Goaltender	United States	22	Alpine, NJ; transfer from Arizona State
Rourke Russell	Defenseman	United States	23	Long Beach, CA; graduate transfer from Miami
Hunter Sansbury	Defenseman	United States	20	Lomita, CA
Neil Shea	Forward	United States	22	Marshfield, MA; transfer from Northeastern

== Roster ==
As of August 23, 2021.

No.	Nat.	Player	Class	Pos	Height	Weight	DoB	Hometown	Previous team	NHL rights
2	(Canada)	Dante Fantauzzi	Sophomore	D	6' 1" (1.85 m)	190 lb (86 kg)	2000-05-01	North York, Ontario	Sioux Falls Stampede (USHL)	—
3	(United States)	Grant Anderson	Sophomore	D	6' 2" (1.88 m)	187 lb (85 kg)	1999-09-15	Plymouth, Minnesota	Omaha Lancers (USHL)	—
4	(Denmark)	Jeppe Urup Morgensen	Junior	D	6' 2" (1.88 m)	176 lb (80 kg)	1999-03-14	Odense, Denmark	Youngstown Phantoms (USHL)	—
5	(United States)	Andrius Kulbis-Marino	Sophomore	D	6' 1" (1.85 m)	175 lb (79 kg)	2000-02-16	Methuen, Massachusetts	Maine Nordiques (NAHL)	—
6	(United States)	Logan Britt	Junior	D	6' 2" (1.88 m)	190 lb (86 kg)	1999-02-10	Crystal Lake, Illinois	Quinnipiac (ECAC)	—
7	(United States)	Daniel Petrick	Junior	D	5' 9" (1.75 m)	199 lb (90 kg)	1999-04-06	Wilbraham, Massachusetts	Madison Capitols (USHL)	—
8	(United States)	Hunter Sansbury	Freshman	D	5' 11" (1.8 m)	180 lb (82 kg)	2000-10-08	Lomita, California	Salmon Arm Silverbacks (BCHL)	—
9	(United States)	Dante Palecco	Graduate	F	5' 11" (1.8 m)	185 lb (84 kg)	1998-04-18	Whippany, New Jersey	Yale Bulldogs men's ice hockey (ECAC)	—
10	(United States)	Alex Bates (A)	Graduate	D	5' 11" (1.8 m)	175 lb (79 kg)	1997-06-17	Parker, Colorado	Wenatchee Wild (BCHL)	—
11	(Canada)	Ryan Steele	Senior	F	6' 1" (1.85 m)	182 lb (83 kg)	1997-09-13	Stratford, Prince Edward Island	West Kelowna Warriors (BCHL)	—
12	(United States)	Kevin Lombardi	Junior	F	6' 4" (1.93 m)	234 lb (106 kg)	1998-08-12	Schwenksville, Pennsylvania	Sioux City Musketeers (USHL)	—
13	(United States)	Cody Hoban	Sophomore	F	5' 9" (1.75 m)	165 lb (75 kg)	2001-04-26	Guilford, Connecticut	Danbury Jr. Hat Tricks (NAHL)	—
14	(United States)	Nick Boyagian	Senior	F	6' 2" (1.88 m)	181 lb (82 kg)	1997-07-16	East Greenbush, New York	New Jersey Titans (NAHL)	—
15	(United States)	Troy Conzo	Graduate	F	5' 10" (1.78 m)	170 lb (77 kg)	1997-02-21	Nesconset, New York	Colorado College (NCHC)	—
16	(United States)	Dakota Raabe	Graduate	F	5' 10" (1.78 m)	170 lb (77 kg)	1997-05-06	Dana Point, California	Michigan (Big Ten)	—
17	(United States)	Ryan Doolin	Sophomore	F	6' 2" (1.88 m)	190 lb (86 kg)	1999-02-06	Hanover, Massachusetts	Alberni Valley Bulldogs (BCHL)	—
18	(United States)	John Jaworski	Sophomore	F	5' 10" (1.78 m)	165 lb (75 kg)	2000-03-20	Grinnell, Iowa	Chicago Steel (USHL)	—
19	(Canada)	Daniel Ebrahim	Freshman	F	6' 0" (1.83 m)	186 lb (84 kg)	2000-07-12	Brooklin, Ontario	Jersey Hitmen (NCDC)	—
20	(Canada)	Adam Tisdale	Senior	F	5' 9" (1.75 m)	171 lb (78 kg)	1998-11-09	Cochrane, Alberta	Clarkson (ECAC)	—
21	(United States)	Tim Clifton	Junior	F	5' 10" (1.78 m)	165 lb (75 kg)	1998-02-23	Farmingdale, New Jersey	Shreveport Mudbugs (NAHL)	—
22	(United States)	Conner Hutchison	Freshman	D	5' 11" (1.8 m)	170 lb (77 kg)	2000-06-02	Hicksville, New York	Tri-City Storm (USHL)	—
23	(Canada)	Braeden Tuck	Junior	F	6' 0" (1.83 m)	183 lb (83 kg)	1998-04-15	Calgary, Alberta	Trail Smoke Eaters (BCHL)	—
24	(United States)	Austin Magera	Senior	F	6' 1" (1.85 m)	185 lb (84 kg)	1998-07-19	Suwanee, Georgia	Lincoln Stars (USHL)	—
26	(United States)	Neil Shea	Junior	F	6' 1" (1.85 m)	198 lb (90 kg)	1999-07-29	Marshfield, Massachusetts	Northeastern (HEA)	—
27	(United States)	Patrick Dawson	Junior	D	6' 0" (1.83 m)	190 lb (86 kg)	1999-01-14	Medway, Massachusetts	Odessa Jackalopes (NAHL)	—
28	(United States)	Rourke Russell	Graduate	D	6' 0" (1.83 m)	188 lb (85 kg)	1998-02-25	Long Beach, California	Miami (NCHC)	—
29	(United States)	Todd Goehring	Senior	F	5' 11" (1.8 m)	175 lb (79 kg)	1997-07-08	Wayside, New Jersey	Chicago Steel (USHL)	—
30	(United States)	Josh Benson	Senior	G	6' 1" (1.85 m)	190 lb (86 kg)	1997-11-04	Stillwater, Minnesota	Fairbanks Ice Dogs (NAHL)	—
31	(United States)	Justin Robbins	Junior	G	5' 9" (1.75 m)	160 lb (73 kg)	1999-03-10	Alpine, New Jersey	Arizona State (NCAA)	—
33	(Canada)	Luke Lush	Junior	G	6' 2" (1.88 m)	194 lb (88 kg)	1998-02-15	Sherwood Park, Alberta	Drayton Valley Thunder (AJHL)	—

== Standings ==
2021–22 Atlantic Hockey Standings
	Conference record										Overall record					
	GP	W	L	T	OW	OL	SW	PTS	GF	GA	GP	W	L	T	GF	GA
#18 American International †*	26	17	7	2	1	2	0	54	97	61	38	22	13	3	134	95
Canisius	26	13	11	2	2	1	1	43	76	67	35	16	16	3	99	97
Army	26	12	11	3	0	1	2	42	75	68	35	14	17	4	98	100
RIT	26	12	10	4	1	3	3	41	69	82	38	18	16	4	92	115
Sacred Heart	26	11	12	3	0	1	3	40	72	70	37	15	18	4	95	100
Air Force	26	11	12	3	3	2	2	37	76	80	36	16	17	3	99	127
Mercyhurst	26	10	12	4	0	1	1	36	75	79	39	16	19	4	114	129
Niagara	26	10	13	3	2	2	1	34	70	79	36	11	22	3	82	122
Bentley	26	10	14	2	1	2	1	34	70	78	36	14	20	2	94	117
Holy Cross	26	10	14	2	3	0	0	29	56	72	37	12	23	2	77	108
Championship: March 19, 2022 † indicates conference regular season champion * indicates conference tournament champion (Riley Trophy); Rankings: USCHO.com Top 20 Poll

== Schedule and results ==
Date	Time	Opponent^{#}	Rank^{#}	Site	TV	Decision	Result	Attendance	Record
Regular season
October 2	4:05 PM	at Connecticut*		XL Center • Hartford, Connecticut		Benson	L 3–6	2,417	0–1–0
October 9	7:00 PM	at Merrimack*		J. Thom Lawler Rink • North Andover, Massachusetts		Robbins	L 2–4	1,152	0–2–0
October 15	7:30 PM	at #12 Boston University*		Agganis Arena • Boston, Massachusetts		Robbins	W 3–2	3,158	1–2–0
October 16	7:00 PM	at #12 Boston University*		Agganis Arena • Boston, Massachusetts		Robbins	L 1–4	3,201	1–3–0
October 22	7:30 PM	at Maine*		Alfond Arena • Orono, Maine		Robbins	W 1–0	4,142	2–3–0
October 23	5:00 PM	at Maine*		Alfond Arena • Orono, Maine		Robbins	T 3–3 ^{OT}	3,136	2–3–1
October 29	5:35 PM	Niagara		Webster Bank Arena • Bridgeport, Connecticut		Robbins	L 1–6	413	2–4–1 (0–1–0)
October 30	1:05 PM	Niagara		Webster Bank Arena • Bridgeport, Connecticut		Robbins	W 3–1	353	3–4–1 (1–1–0)
November 5	7:05 PM	at Mercyhurst		Mercyhurst Ice Center • Erie, Pennsylvania		Robbins	T 3–3 ^{SOW}	889	3–4–2 (1–1–1)
November 6	4:05 PM	at Mercyhurst		Mercyhurst Ice Center • Erie, Pennsylvania		Robbins	T 3–3 ^{SOW}	697	3–4–3 (1–1–2)
November 19	9:05 PM	at Air Force		Cadet Ice Arena • Colorado Springs, Colorado		Robbins	L 2–3	1,925	3–5–3 (1–2–2)
November 20	7:05 PM	at Air Force		Cadet Ice Arena • Colorado Springs, Colorado		Benson	W 3–1	1,390	4–5–3 (2–2–2)
November 22	9:05 PM	at Air Force		Cadet Ice Arena • Colorado Springs, Colorado		Benson	W 4–2	1,350	5–5–3 (3–2–2)
November 23	9:05 PM	at Air Force		Cadet Ice Arena • Colorado Springs, Colorado		Robbins	W 3–1	1,207	6–5–3 (4–2–2)
December 2	7:05 PM	at Army		Tate Rink • West Point, New York		Benson	L 1–4	1,068	6–6–3 (4–3–2)
January 7	7:00 PM	at Niagara		Dwyer Arena • Lewiston, New York		Benson	L 4–5 ^{OT}	537	6–7–3 (4–4–2)
January 8	5:00 PM	at Niagara		Dwyer Arena • Lewiston, New York		Lush	W 2–1	538	7–7–3 (5–4–2)
January 11	4:00 PM	RIT		Webster Bank Arena • Bridgeport, Connecticut		Lush	L 2–3	179	7–8–3 (5–5–2)
January 14	7:05 PM	at Bentley		Bentley Arena • Waltham, Massachusetts		Robbins	W 5–1	689	8–8–3 (6–5–2)
January 15	5:05 PM	at Bentley		Bentley Arena • Waltham, Massachusetts		Lush	L 3–4	874	8–9–3 (6–6–2)
January 18	6:05 PM	Army		Webster Bank Arena • Bridgeport, Connecticut		Robbins	W 4–2	313	9–9–3 (7–6–2)
January 21	6:05 PM	American International		Webster Bank Arena • Bridgeport, Connecticut		Robbins	L 2–4	243	9–10–3 (7–7–2)
January 22	1:05 PM	American International		Webster Bank Arena • Bridgeport, Connecticut		Lush	L 1–3	253	9–11–3 (7–8–2)
Connecticut Ice
January 29	7:00 PM	#2 Quinnipiac*		Webster Bank Arena • Bridgeport, Connecticut (Connecticut Ice semifinal)	SNY	Robbins	L 2–3 ^{OT}	0	9–12–3
January 30	1:00 PM	Yale*		Webster Bank Arena • Bridgeport, Connecticut (Connecticut Ice consolation game)	SNY	Benson	W 4–3 ^{OT}	0	10–12–3
February 1	2:00 PM	vs. RIT		Tate Rink • West Point, New York		Benson	L 1–5	0	10–13–3 (7–9–2)
February 4	7:00 PM	at Holy Cross		Hart Center • Worcester, Massachusetts		Robbins	L 0–1	197	10–14–3 (7–10–2)
February 5	7:00 PM	at Holy Cross		Hart Center • Worcester, Massachusetts		Robbins	W 4–1	798	11–14–3 (8–10–2)
February 10	7:05 PM	Bentley		Webster Bank Arena • Bridgeport, Connecticut		Robbins	W 5–3	231	12–14–3 (9–10–2)
February 11	6:05 PM	Bentley		Webster Bank Arena • Bridgeport, Connecticut		Robbins	W 3–1	341	13–14–3 (10–10–2)
February 18	7:05 PM	at Canisius		LECOM Harborcenter • Buffalo, New York		Robbins	L 1–3	585	13–15–3 (10–11–2)
February 19	7:05 PM	at Canisius		LECOM Harborcenter • Buffalo, New York		Robbins	L 1–3	803	13–16–3 (10–12–2)
February 25	6:05 PM	Army		Webster Bank Arena • Bridgeport, Connecticut		Benson	W 5–2	853	14–16–3 (11–12–2)
February 26	4:05 PM	at Army		Tate Rink • West Point, New York		Benson	T 6–6 ^{SOW}	1,814	14–16–4 (11–12–3)
Atlantic Hockey Tournament
March 11	7:00 PM	at RIT*		Gene Polisseni Center • Henrietta, New York (Quarterfinal game 1)		Robbins	L 0–1 ^{OT}	1,104	14–17–4
March 12	7:00 PM	at RIT*		Gene Polisseni Center • Henrietta, New York (Quarterfinal game 2)		Robbins	W 3–1	1,195	15–17–4
March 13	5:00 PM	at RIT*		Gene Polisseni Center • Henrietta, New York (Quarterfinal game 3)		Robbins	L 1–3	805	15–18–4
Sacred Heart Lost Series 1–2
*Non-conference game. ^{#}Rankings from USCHO.com Poll. All times are in Eastern Time. Source:

== Scoring statistics ==
Name	Position	Games	Goals	Assists	Points	PIM
Neil Shea	F	37	11	20	31	10
Braeden Tuck	F	35	12	15	27	2
Austin Magera	C	30	10	14	24	25
Ryan Steele	F	34	10	11	21	29
Logan Britt	D	37	3	18	21	30
John Jaworski	F	37	9	8	17	13
Andrius Kulbis-Marino	D	35	6	10	16	17
Nick Boyagian	F	34	3	10	13	2
Todd Goehring	F	36	9	3	12	10
Kevin Lombardi	RW	18	5	6	11	6
Troy Conzo	F	33	3	7	10	10
Hunter Sansbury	D	36	0	10	10	18
Conner Hutchison	D	25	3	6	9	8
Rourke Russell	D	36	2	7	9	26
Dante Palecco	LW	34	3	5	8	2
Dakota Raabe	F	34	2	6	8	2
Adam Tisdale	C	27	2	5	7	4
Patrick Dawson	D	37	2	3	5	35
Alex Bates	D	19	0	2	2	0
Jeppe Urup Mogensen	D	5	0	1	1	0
Ryan Doolin	F	9	0	1	1	2
Dante Fantauzzi	D	15	0	1	1	12
Tim Clifton	C	21	0	1	1	4
Justin Robbins	G	28	0	1	1	0
Daniel Petrick	D	2	0	0	0	0
Jack O'Dea	G	2	0	0	0	0
Cody Hoban	F	5	0	0	0	0
Luke Lush	G	6	0	0	0	0
Grant Anderson	D	9	0	0	0	0
Josh Benson	G	11	0	0	0	0
Daniel Ebrahim	LW	21	0	0	0	21
Bench	-	-	-	-	-	0
Total			95	171	266	288

== Goaltending statistics ==
Name	Games	Minutes	Wins	Losses	Ties	Goals against	Saves	Shut outs	SV %	GAA
Luke Lush	6	202	1	3	0	8	99	0	.925	2.37
Justin Robbins	29	1539	10	12	3	61	609	1	.909	2.38
Josh Benson	13	491	4	3	1	25	196	0	.887	3.05
Empty Net	-	25	-	-	-	2	-	-	-	-
Total	37	2258	15	18	4	100	904	1	.900	2.66

== Rankings ==
Poll	Week																									
Poll	Pre	1	2	3	4	5	6	7	8	9	10	11	12	13	14	15	16	17	18	19	20	21	22	23	24	25 (Final)
USCHO.com	NR	NR	NR	NR	NR	NR	NR	NR	NR	NR	NR	NR	NR	NR	NR	NR	NR	NR	NR	NR	NR	NR	NR	NR	-	NR
USA Today	NR	NR	NR	NR	NR	NR	NR	NR	NR	NR	NR	NR	NR	NR	NR	NR	NR	NR	NR	NR	NR	NR	NR	NR	NR	NR

Note: USCHO did not release a poll in week 24.

== Awards and honors ==
Player	Award	Ref
Neil Shea	Atlantic Hockey Regular Season Scoring Trophy	
Logan Britt	Atlantic Hockey Second Team	
Neil Shea	Atlantic Hockey Second Team	
Braeden Tuck	Atlantic Hockey Third Team	
