= Holy Cross Crusaders men's ice hockey statistical leaders =

The Holy Cross Crusaders men's ice hockey statistical leaders are individual statistical leaders of the Holy Cross Crusaders men's ice hockey program in various categories, including goals, assists, points, and saves. Within those areas, the lists identify single-game, single-season, and career leaders. The Crusaders represent the College of the Holy Cross in the NCAA's Atlantic Hockey.

Holy Cross began competing in intercollegiate ice hockey in 1966. These lists are updated through the end of the 2025–26 season.

== Goals ==
Career
Rk	Player	Goals	Seasons
1	Larry Murphy	119	1966–67 1967–68 1968–69 1969–70
2	Joe Lunny	103	1982–83 1983–84 1984–85 1985–86
3	Jerry DeLeo	101	1982–83 1983–84 1984–85 1985–86
4	Gerry Curley	93	1977–78 1978–79 1979–80 1980–81
5	Bill Butler	91	1966–67 1967–68 1968–69
6	Matt Muniz	87	1982–83 1983–84 1984–85 1985–86
7	Mike Germain	82	1984–85 1985–86 1986–87 1987–88
8	Owen Dugan	78	1979–80 1980–81 1981–82 1982–83
9	Glenn Graves	75	1973–74 1974–75 1975–76 1976–77
10	Bill Bellerose	71	1973–74 1974–75 1975–76 1976–77

Season
Rk	Player	Goals	Season
1	Larry Murphy	45	1969–70
2	Jerry DeLeo	40	1984–85
3	Larry Murphy	38	1968–69
4	Bill Butler	36	1966–67
	Larry Murphy	36	1967–68
6	Joe Lunny	34	1984–85
	Mike Germain	34	1987–88
8	Matt Muniz	33	1984–85
9	Bill Bellerose	31	1973–74
	Gerry Curley	31	1980–81

== Assists ==
Career
Rk	Player	Assists	Seasons
1	Glenn Graves	122	1973–74 1974–75 1975–76 1976–77
2	Matt Muniz	120	1982–83 1983–84 1984–85 1985–86
3	Jerry DeLeo	117	1982–83 1983–84 1984–85 1985–86
4	Joe Lunny	116	1982–83 1983–84 1984–85 1985–86
5	James Sixsmith	104	2003–04 2004–05 2005–06 2006–07
6	Gerry Curley	98	1977–78 1978–79 1979–80 1980–81
7	Mark Wright	92	1983–84 1984–85 1985–86 1986–87
8	Chris Brown	90	1979–80 1980–81 1981–82 1982–83
	Patrick Rissmiller	90	1998–99 1999–00 2000–01 2001–02
10	Bill Butler	89	1966–67 1967–68 1968–69

Season
Rk	Player	Assists	Season
1	Matt Muniz	53	1984–85
2	Jerry DeLeo	48	1984–85
3	Glenn Graves	42	1973–74
4	Joe Lunny	37	1984–85
	John Gillis	37	1987–88
6	Bill Butler	36	1968–69
7	Bill Butler	35	1967–68
	Glenn Graves	35	1974–75
9	Larry Murphy	34	1969–70
10	Jay Gibbons	32	1968–69
	Rich Pelletier	32	1968–69
	Mark Wright	32	1985–86

== Points ==
Career
Rk	Player	Points	Seasons
1	Joe Lunny	219	1982–83 1983–84 1984–85 1985–86
2	Jerry DeLeo	218	1982–83 1983–84 1984–85 1985–86
3	Larry Murphy	207	1966–67 1967–68 1968–69 1969–70
	Matt Muniz	207	1982–83 1983–84 1984–85 1985–86
5	Glenn Graves	197	1973–74 1974–75 1975–76 1976–77
6	Gerry Curley	191	1977–78 1978–79 1979–80 1980–81
7	Bill Butler	180	1966–67 1967–68 1968–69
8	Bill Bellerose	152	1973–74 1974–75 1975–76 1976–77
	James Sixsmith	152	2003–04 2004–05 2005–06 2006–07
10	John Powell	147	1977–78 1978–79 1979–80 1980–81

Season
Rk	Player	Points	Season
1	Jerry DeLeo	88	1984–85
2	Matt Muniz	86	1984–85
3	Larry Murphy	79	1969–70
4	Joe Lunny	71	1984–85
5	Larry Murphy	64	1967–68
	Larry Murphy	64	1968–69
7	Bill Butler	63	1967–68
	Bill Butler	63	1968–69
9	Mike Germain	62	1987–88
10	Glenn Graves	59	1973–74
	Gerry Curley	59	1980–81
	Joe Lunny	59	1985–86

== Saves ==
Career
Rk	Player	Saves	Seasons
1	Matt Ginn	3587	2011–12 2012–13 2013–14 2014–15
2	Paul Pijanowski	2915	1984–85 1985–86 1986–87
3	Paul Berrafato	2874	2014–15 2015–16 2016–17 2017–18
4	Tony Quesada	2700	2002–03 2003–04 2004–05 2005–06
5	Rob Arena	2176	1987–88 1988–89 1989–90
6	Thomas Gale	2109	2021–22 2022–23 2023–24 2024–25
7	Adam Roy	1910	2007–08 2008–09 2009–10 2010–11
8	Jim Stewart	1823	1974–75 1975–76 1977–78 1978–79
9	Kevin Broderick	1748	1992–93 1993–94 1994–95
10	Matt Radomsky	1599	2019–20 2020–21 2021–22

Season
Rk	Player	Saves	Season
1	Matt Ginn	1076	2013–14
2	Paul Berrafato	1060	2017–18
3	Thomas Gale	1056	2024–25
4	Matt Ginn	994	2012–13
5	Matt Radomsky	892	2019–20
6	Matt Ginn	888	2014–15
7	Paul Pijanowski	872	1984–85
8	Tony Quesada	840	2005–06
	Paul Berrafato	840	2016–17
10	Thomas Tysowsky	839	2009–10
