= 2021–22 Holy Cross Crusaders men's ice hockey season =

- Conference: 10th Atlantic Hockey
- Home ice: Hart Center

Rankings
- USCHO: NR
- USA Today: NR

Record
- Overall: 12–23–2
- Conference: 10–14–2
- Home: 6–10–1
- Road: 6–11–1
- Neutral: 0–2–0

Coaches and captains
- Head coach: Bill Riga
- Assistant coaches: Eric Sorenson; Castan Sommer; Bobby Butler
- Captain: Matt Slick
- Alternate captain(s): Ryan Leibold; Anthony Vincent

The 2021–22 Holy Cross Crusaders men's ice hockey season was the 56th season of play for the program, the 24th at the Division I level, and the 19th season in the Atlantic Hockey conference. The Crusaders represented the College of the Holy Cross and were coached by Bill Riga, in his 1st season.

== Season ==
Under their new head coach, the Crusaders started the season poorly, winning just one of their first ten matches. The offense slowly improved as the season went along, but Holy Cross couldn't keep the puck out of their own net, allowing at least 3 goals in fifteen of their eighteen games in the first half of the year. It was no coincidence that they won all three of those games.

The second half of the year was going much like the first and Holy Cross found itself mired in at the bottom of the Atlantic Hockey standings. Throughout January, the defense played much better but the team's scoring dried up. However, the Crusaders seemed to turn things around when the defeated the top team in the conference, American International, at the end of the month. In the final four weeks of the regular season, Holy Cross won nearly as many games as they had through the first four months. While they were too far back in the standings to move up, the late surge gave the team hope that they could advance in the postseason.

Holy Cross opened at Mercyhurst and outplayed the Lakers in both games. Unfortunately, while they outshot Mercyhurst 76–35, they lost both games 1–2.

== Departures ==
Player	Position	Nationality	Cause
Frank Boie	Defenseman	Canada	Graduation (retired)
Andrew Dumaresque	Forward	Canada	Graduation (retired)
Logan Ferguson	Forward	Canada	Graduation (retired)
Conner Jean	Forward	United States	Transferred to Carleton
Peter Kessel	Forward	United States	Graduation (retired)
Logan Milliken	Defenseman	Canada	Graduation (signed with Siksika Buffaloes)
Jake Pappalardo	Forward	United States	Graduation (signed with Tulsa Oilers)

== Recruiting ==
Player	Position	Nationality	Age	Notes
Daniel Colabufo	Forward	United States	20	Camillus, NY
Liam Connors	Forward	United States	20	Southborough, MA
Thomas Gale	Goaltender	Canada	21	Kirkland, QC
John Gelatt	Forward	United States	20	Middletown, NJ
Tyler Ghirardosi	Forward	Canada	21	Montrose, BC; transfer from Quinnipiac
Matthew Guerra	Forward	United States	22	Orlando, FL; transfer from Robert Morris
Jack Hillman	Defenseman	United States	20	Zionsville, IN
Mathew Shatsky	Defenseman	Canada	20	Winnipeg, MB

== Roster ==
As of August 31, 2021.

No.	Nat.	Player	Class	Pos	Height	Weight	DoB	Hometown	Previous team	NHL rights
2	(United States)	Jack Robilotti	Sophomore	D	6' 3" (1.91 m)	194 lb (88 kg)	2001-07-18	New York, New York	Fargo (USHL)	—
3	(United States)	Daniel Colabufo	Freshman	F	5' 9" (1.75 m)	170 lb (77 kg)	2001-06-19	Camillus, New York	Maryland (NAHL)	—
4	(United States)	Jake Higgins	Sophomore	D	6' 2" (1.88 m)	205 lb (93 kg)	2001-06-09	Hingham, Massachusetts	Deerfield (USHS–MA)	—
5	(United States)	Mike Higgins	Junior	D	5' 10" (1.78 m)	205 lb (93 kg)	2000-04-06	Needham, Massachusetts	Northeast (NAHL)	—
6	(United States)	Bryce Dolan	Senior	D	6' 1" (1.85 m)	190 lb (86 kg)	1999-02-13	Barrington, Rhode Island	Kimball Union (USHS–NH)	—
7	(United States)	Nick Hale	Junior	D	5' 9" (1.75 m)	165 lb (75 kg)	1999-05-07	Raleigh, North Carolina	Brooks (AJHL)	—
8	(United States)	Michael Kane	Sophomore	F	6' 0" (1.83 m)	190 lb (86 kg)	2000-04-01	Guilford, Connecticut	Jersey (NCDC)	—
11	(United States)	Ryan Pineault	Sophomore	D	5' 9" (1.75 m)	160 lb (73 kg)	2001-02-10	Glastonbury, Connecticut	Westminster (USHS–CT)	—
12	(United States)	Matt Guerra	Sophomore	F	5' 8" (1.73 m)	165 lb (75 kg)	1999-05-21	Orlando, Florida	Robert Morris (AHA)	—
13	(Canada)	Grayson Constable	Junior	F	6' 2" (1.88 m)	201 lb (91 kg)	1998-05-05	Lethbridge, Alberta	Bonnyville (AJHL)	—
14	(Canada)	Matt Shatsky	Freshman	D	6' 0" (1.83 m)	180 lb (82 kg)	2001-04-29	Winnipeg, Manitoba	Sherwood Park (AJHL)	—
15	(Canada)	Jack Ricketts	Sophomore	F	6' 1" (1.85 m)	195 lb (88 kg)	1999-09-08	Oakville, Ontario	Oakville (OJHL)	—
17	(United States)	Ryan Leibold (A)	Senior	F	5' 10" (1.78 m)	195 lb (88 kg)	1998-11-03	Ashburn, Virginia	Sioux City (USHL)	—
18	(Canada)	Bobby Young	Junior	F	5' 11" (1.8 m)	185 lb (84 kg)	1998-11-08	Kitchener, Ontario	Bonnyville (AJHL)	—
19	(United States)	Alex Peterson	Junior	F	5' 10" (1.78 m)	172 lb (78 kg)	1998-03-27	Lansdale, Pennsylvania	Amarillo (NAHL)	—
20	(United States)	Jack Hillman	Freshman	D	6' 2" (1.88 m)	185 lb (84 kg)	2001-07-04	Zionsville, Indiana	Maryland (NAHL)	—
21	(United States)	Alec Cicero	Sophomore	F	5' 10" (1.78 m)	180 lb (82 kg)	2001-03-09	Williamsville, New York	Buffalo (OJHL)	—
22	(Canada)	Lucas Thorne	Sophomore	F	6' 0" (1.83 m)	185 lb (84 kg)	1999-03-05	Dunnville, Ontario	Bonnyville (AJHL)	—
23	(United States)	Jackson MacNab	Junior	F	6' 4" (1.93 m)	200 lb (91 kg)	1998-07-03	Indianapolis, Indiana	Notre Dame (Big Ten)	—
24	(United States)	John Gelatt	Freshman	F	5' 11" (1.8 m)	195 lb (88 kg)	2001-04-29	Middletown, New Jersey	Johnstown (NAHL)	—
26	(United States)	Liam Connors	Freshman	F	5' 9" (1.75 m)	165 lb (75 kg)	2001-02-01	Westborough, Massachusetts	Connecticut (NCDC)	—
27	(United States)	Matt Slick (C)	Senior	D	6' 1" (1.85 m)	214 lb (97 kg)	1999-03-13	Buffalo, New York	Chilliwack (BCHL)	—
29	(United States)	Erik Gordon	Senior	G	5' 10" (1.78 m)	172 lb (78 kg)	1999-01-05	Duluth, Georgia	Calgary Canucks (AJHL)	—
30	(Canada)	Matt Radomsky	Junior	G	6' 2" (1.88 m)	185 lb (84 kg)	1999-06-21	Winnipeg, Manitoba	Steinbach (MJHL)	—
33	(Canada)	Thomas Gale	Freshman	G	6' 1" (1.85 m)	180 lb (82 kg)	2000-06-10	Kirkland, Quebec	P. A. L. (NCDC)	—
34	(United States)	Anthony Vincent (A)	Senior	F	5' 10" (1.78 m)	180 lb (82 kg)	1997-08-12	Wilton, Connecticut	Chilliwack (BCHL)	—
39	(Canada)	Tyler Ghirardosi	Sophomore	F	6' 3" (1.91 m)	185 lb (84 kg)	1999-10-01	Montrose, British Columbia	Quinnipiac (ECAC)	—
40	(Finland)	Erkka Vänskä	Senior	F	5' 11" (1.8 m)	168 lb (76 kg)	1998-02-15	Espoo, Finland	Fairbanks (NAHL)	—

== Standings ==
2021–22 Atlantic Hockey Standings
	Conference record										Overall record					
	GP	W	L	T	OW	OL	SW	PTS	GF	GA	GP	W	L	T	GF	GA
#18 American International †*	26	17	7	2	1	2	0	54	97	61	38	22	13	3	134	95
Canisius	26	13	11	2	2	1	1	43	76	67	35	16	16	3	99	97
Army	26	12	11	3	0	1	2	42	75	68	35	14	17	4	98	100
RIT	26	12	10	4	1	3	3	41	69	82	38	18	16	4	92	115
Sacred Heart	26	11	12	3	0	1	3	40	72	70	37	15	18	4	95	100
Air Force	26	11	12	3	3	2	2	37	76	80	36	16	17	3	99	127
Mercyhurst	26	10	12	4	0	1	1	36	75	79	39	16	19	4	114	129
Niagara	26	10	13	3	2	2	1	34	70	79	36	11	22	3	82	122
Bentley	26	10	14	2	1	2	1	34	70	78	36	14	20	2	94	117
Holy Cross	26	10	14	2	3	0	0	29	56	72	37	12	23	2	77	108
Championship: March 19, 2022 † indicates conference regular season champion * indicates conference tournament champion (Riley Trophy); Rankings: USCHO.com Top 20 Poll

== Schedule and results ==
Date	Time	Opponent^{#}	Rank^{#}	Site	TV	Decision	Result	Attendance	Record
Exhibition
October 2	7:30 PM	at #10 Boston University*		Walter Brown Arena • Boston, Massachusetts (Exhibition)			L 1–6	1,922	
Ice Breaker Tournament
October 8	7:30 PM	vs. #18 Northeastern*		DCU Center • Worcester, Massachusetts (Ice Breaker Game 1)		Radomsky	L 0–3	1,627	0–1–0
October 9	7:30 PM	vs. #6 Boston College*		DCU Center • Worcester, Massachusetts (Ice Breaker Game 2)	NESN	Gordon	L 1–6	2,052	0–2–0
Regular Season
October 15	7:05 PM	at Mercyhurst		Mercyhurst Ice Center • Erie, Pennsylvania		Radomsky	T 4–4 ^{SOL}	813	0–2–1 (0–0–1)
October 16	3:05 PM	at Mercyhurst		Mercyhurst Ice Center • Erie, Pennsylvania		Gale	L 2–5	512	0–3–1 (0–1–1)
October 21	7:05 PM	Bentley		Hart Center • Worcester, Massachusetts		Radomsky	L 2–4	537	0–4–1 (0–2–1)
October 22	4:05 PM	at Bentley		Bentley Arena • Waltham, Massachusetts		Gale	W 3–2	1,761	1–4–1 (1–2–1)
October 26	7:00 PM	at #5 Quinnipiac*		People's United Center • Hamden, Connecticut		Gale	L 2–5	2,502	1–5–1
November 4	7:30 PM	at #17 Notre Dame*		Compton Family Ice Arena • Notre Dame, Indiana	NBCSN	Radomsky	L 2–5	2,480	1–6–1
November 5	7:30 PM	at #17 Notre Dame*		Compton Family Ice Arena • Notre Dame, Indiana	NBCRN	Gale	L 1–4	4,521	1–7–1
November 12	7:05 PM	Mercyhurst		Hart Center • Worcester, Massachusetts		Radomsky	L 2–3	435	1–8–1 (1–3–1)
November 13	5:05 PM	Mercyhurst		Hart Center • Worcester, Massachusetts		Radomsky	W 5–4 ^{OT}	302	2–8–1 (2–3–1)
November 19	7:05 PM	at RIT		Gene Polisseni Center • Henrietta, New York		Radomsky	L 2–3	2,027	2–9–1 (2–4–1)
November 20	5:05 PM	at RIT		Gene Polisseni Center • Henrietta, New York		Gordon	L 3–4	1,853	2–10–1 (2–5–1)
November 23	7:00 PM	at Merrimack*		J. Thom Lawler Rink • North Andover, Massachusetts		Gordon	L 2–3	214	2–11–1
November 26	2:05 PM	Brown*		Hart Center • Worcester, Massachusetts		Radomsky	W 5–1	261	3–11–1
November 27	7:00 PM	at New Hampshire*		Whittemore Center • Durham, New Hampshire		Radomsky	L 2–3 ^{OT}	2,919	3–12–1
December 3	7:05 PM	Niagara		Hart Center • Worcester, Massachusetts		Radomsky	L 1–3	322	3–13–1 (2–6–1)
December 4	7:05 PM	Niagara		Hart Center • Worcester, Massachusetts		Radomsky	W 3–2	245	4–13–1 (3–6–1)
January 4	7:05 PM	Vermont*		Hart Center • Worcester, Massachusetts		Gale	W 4–3	483	5–13–1
January 7	7:05 PM	American International		Hart Center • Worcester, Massachusetts		Gordon	L 0–2	0	5–14–1 (3–7–1)
January 8	5:05 PM	American International		Hart Center • Worcester, Massachusetts		Gordon	L 2–5	0	5–15–1 (3–8–1)
January 14	7:05 PM	Canisius		Hart Center • Worcester, Massachusetts		Radomsky	T 1–1 ^{SOL}	77	5–15–2 (3–8–2)
January 15	7:05 PM	Canisius		Hart Center • Worcester, Massachusetts		Radomsky	L 1–2	89	5–16–2 (3–9–2)
January 21	7:05 PM	at Army		Tate Rink • West Point, New York		Radomsky	W 3–1	1,302	6–16–2 (4–9–2)
January 22	4:05 PM	at Army		Tate Rink • West Point, New York		Radomsky	L 1–4	1,538	6–17–2 (4–10–2)
January 28	5:05 PM	at American International		MassMutual Center • Springfield, Massachusetts		Radomsky	L 1–3	191	6–18–2 (4–11–2)
January 29	12:05 PM	at American International		MassMutual Center • Springfield, Massachusetts		Radomsky	W 5–4	191	7–18–2 (5–11–2)
February 4	7:00 PM	Sacred Heart		Hart Center • Worcester, Massachusetts		Radomsky	W 1–0	197	8–18–2 (6–11–2)
February 5	7:00 PM	Sacred Heart		Hart Center • Worcester, Massachusetts		Radomsky	L 1–4	798	8–19–2 (6–12–2)
February 11	9:05 PM	at Air Force		Cadet Ice Arena • Colorado Springs, Colorado		Gordon	W 3–2	1,327	9–19–2 (7–12–2)
February 12	7:05 PM	at Air Force		Cadet Ice Arena • Colorado Springs, Colorado		Radomsky	W 3–2	1,542	10–19–2 (8–12–2)
February 18	7:00 PM	Army		Hart Center • Worcester, Massachusetts		Radomsky	L 1–2	207	10–20–2 (8–13–2)
February 19	7:00 PM	Army		Hart Center • Worcester, Massachusetts		Radomsky	L 1–3	350	10–21–2 (8–14–2)
February 25	7:00 PM	at Bentley		Bentley Arena • Waltham, Massachusetts		Radomsky	W 3–2 ^{OT}	1,250	11–21–2 (9–14–2)
February 26	7:00 PM	Bentley		Hart Center • Worcester, Massachusetts		Gordon	W 2–1	650	12–21–2 (10–14–2)
Atlantic Hockey Tournament
March 4	7:05 PM	at Mercyhurst*		Mercyhurst Ice Center • Erie, Pennsylvania (First Round game 1)		Radomsky	L 1–2 ^{OT}	687	12–22–2
March 5	7:05 PM	at Mercyhurst*		Mercyhurst Ice Center • Erie, Pennsylvania (First Round game 2)		Gordon	L 1–2	704	12–23–2
Holy Cross Lost Series 0–2
*Non-conference game. ^{#}Rankings from USCHO.com Poll. All times are in Eastern Time. Source:

== Scoring statistics ==
Name	Position	Games	Goals	Assists	Points	PIM
Ryan Leibold	F	35	10	16	26	24
Nick Hale	D	35	4	18	22	20
Jack Ricketts	C	35	10	8	18	28
Matt Guerra	F	35	7	11	18	45
Lucas Thorne	C	35	7	10	17	6
John Gelatt	F	36	2	10	12	8
Anthony Vincent	F	31	5	7	12	21
Matt Slick	D	37	4	7	11	16
Alec Cicero	F	35	4	7	11	23
Alex Peterson	F	35	2	9	11	34
Grayson Constable	F	32	7	1	8	23
Mike Higgins	D	36	4	4	8	23
Tyler Ghirardosi	F	23	3	4	7	34
Bobby Young	C	31	4	1	5	12
Liam Connors	F	22	2	2	4	6
Jackson MacNab	RW	35	1	3	4	6
Jake Higgins	D	33	1	3	4	20
Matt Shatsky	D	34	0	4	4	2
Matt Radomsky	G	24	0	1	1	0
Thomas Gale	G	9	0	1	1	0
Michael Kane	F	11	0	0	0	0
Erik Gordon	G	11	0	0	0	0
Jack Hillman	D	12	0	0	0	5
Daniel Colabufo	F	15	0	0	0	4
Jack Robilotti	D	33	0	0	0	43
Bryce Dolan	D	35	0	0	0	4
Total			77	127	204	407

== Goaltending statistics ==
Name	Games	Minutes	Wins	Losses	Ties	Goals against	Saves	Shut outs	SV %	GAA
Matt Radomsky	26	1436	8	14	2	59	566	1	.906	2.47
Erik Gordon	12	429	2	6	0	19	172	0	.901	2.65
Thomas Gale	9	338	2	3	0	21	171	0	.891	3.72
Empty Net	-	40	-	-	-	9	-	-	-	-
Total	37	2244	12	23	2	108	909	1	.894	2.89

== Rankings ==
Poll	Week																									
Poll	Pre	1	2	3	4	5	6	7	8	9	10	11	12	13	14	15	16	17	18	19	20	21	22	23	24	25 (Final)
USCHO.com	NR	NR	NR	NR	NR	NR	NR	NR	NR	NR	NR	NR	NR	NR	NR	NR	NR	NR	NR	NR	NR	NR	NR	NR	-	NR
USA Today	NR	NR	NR	NR	NR	NR	NR	NR	NR	NR	NR	NR	NR	NR	NR	NR	NR	NR	NR	NR	NR	NR	NR	NR	NR	NR

Note: USCHO did not release a poll in week 24.

== Awards and honors ==
Player	Award	Ref
Ryan Leibold	Atlantic Hockey Third Team	
