= Rich Pelletier =

German gridiron football player and coach (born 1951)

Biographical details
- Born: November 22, 1951; Germany

Playing career
- 1969–1972: Holy Cross
- 1973: New England Colonials
- Positions: Defensive back, punter

Coaching career (HC unless noted)
- 1989–1992: Gallaudet

Head coaching record
- Overall: 9–27–1

Richard Pelletier (born November 22, 1951) is an American former football player and coach. He served as the head football coach at Gallaudet University in Washington, D.C. from 1989 to 1992, compiling a record of 9–27–1.
