= Gene Polisseni Center =

Ice arena of the Rochester Institute of Technology

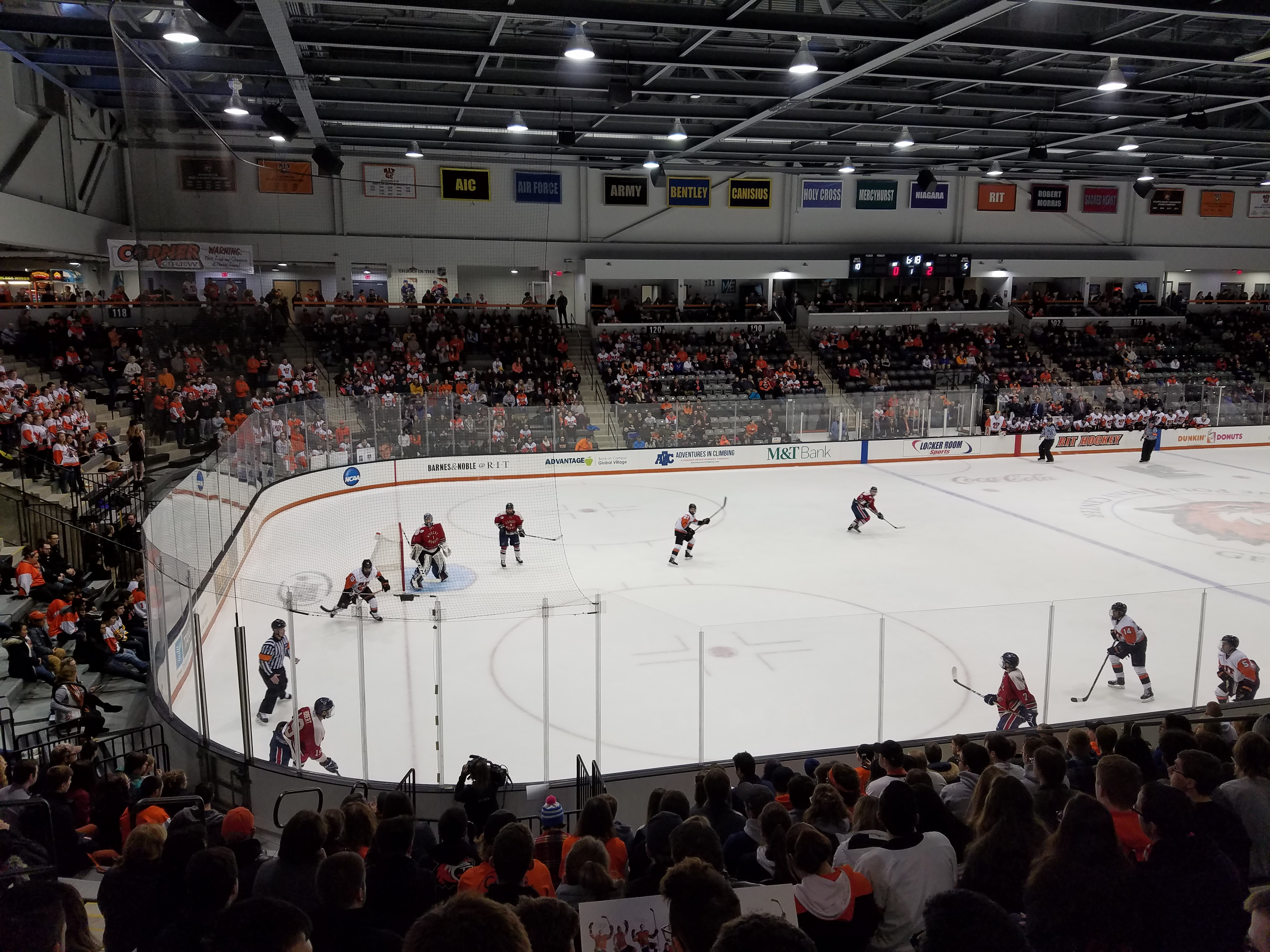
- Gene Polisseni Center during an RIT hockey game
- Interactive map of Gene Polisseni Center
- Location: 200 Lomb Memorial Drive; Henrietta, New York 14623
- Coordinates: 43°4′57.26″N 77°40′28.56″W
- Owner: Rochester Institute of Technology
- Operator: Rochester Institute of Technology
- Capacity: Ice Hockey: 4,300; Concerts: 5,980
- Surface: Ice
- Field size: 200x85ft

Construction
- Groundbreaking: October 19, 2012; 13 years ago
- Opened: September 18, 2014; 11 years ago
- Cost: $38 million USD
- Architect: BBB Architects
- Main contractors: LeChase Construction Services, LLC

Tenants
- RIT Tigers men's ice hockey (2014–present); RIT Tigers women's ice hockey (2014–present)

Website
- Gene Polisseni Center at RIT Arenas

The Gene Polisseni Center (colloquially known as the Polisseum or by its initials, the GPC) is an ice arena on the Rochester Institute of Technology campus in Henrietta, New York. Ground was broken for the project on October 19, 2012, and the arena was officially dedicated on September 18, 2014.

The arena is the home of the varsity ice hockey teams at RIT, replacing the Frank Ritter Memorial Ice Arena. Ritter Arena continued to be used as an ice arena until 2021 when it was converted to a temporary library, and is soon to be repurposed into an indoor turf field. The Polisseni Center serves primarily as a hockey arena (for RIT varsity hockey and local youth programs), and it will also be a multi-purpose venue. The Polisseni Center is built not far from Ritter Arena on the RIT campus, south of the Student Alumni Union, replacing portions of parking lot U.

== Fundraising efforts ==
Fundraising was started with a $1 million USD donation from Stephen and Vicki Schultz. Naming rights were given based on a $4.5 million donation from the Polisseni Foundation (with backing from B. Thomas Golisano) and were announced on November 11, 2011 during the men's hockey game against Air Force.

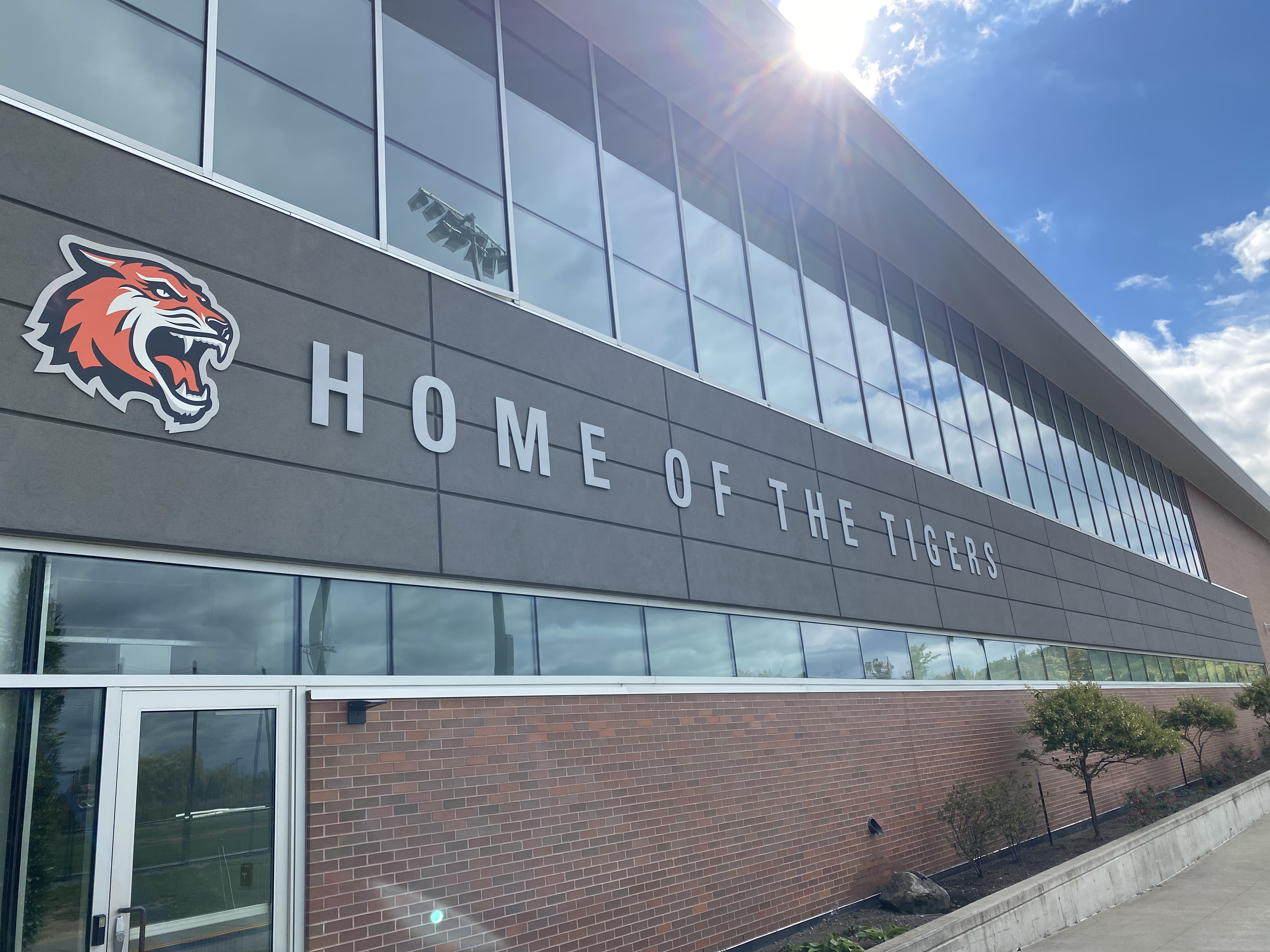
West exterior wall of the Gene Polisseni Center

With arena construction being an estimated $30 million, the funding of the project has been divided into two components. The first half will be borrowed against RIT's endowment fund (worth $544 million), and paid back with sponsorship and ticket sales. The second half of the cost is a grassroots fundraising effort called the Tiger Power Play. The Tiger Power Play is an effort to bring in both big name donations (like Tom Golisano) as well as garner support from students and alumni. Small donations could be made by cell phone text message. Larger donations have been working directly with school administration. Sales of nameplates for seats is also available, initially costing $1,000 per nameplate, and later reduced to $500.

J. M. Allain, the former CEO of Trans-Lux and an RIT graduate, donated $1 million for a new video scoreboard.

== Temporary closure ==
The arena was temporarily shut down on October 15, 2021 for an ammonia leak early in the morning, which also closed down the neighboring Andrews Memorial Drive and Parking Lot U. This prompted University officials to move their women's hockey exhibition game against Cornell University to the Blue Cross Arena in Downtown Rochester and postpone their women's hockey game against St. Lawrence to Tuesday, November 23.

The arena reopened on October 29, 2021, when the women's team hosted St. Thomas and the men's team hosted Mercyhurst.
