= 2021–22 NCAA Division I men's ice hockey rankings =

- NCAA tournament: 2022
- NCAA champion: Denver
- Preseason No. 1 (USA Today): Massachusetts
- Preseason No. 1 (USCHO): Massachusetts
- NCAA Division I men's ice hockey rankings

Two human polls made up the 2021–22 NCAA Division I men's ice hockey rankings, the USCHO.com/CBS College Sports poll and the USA Today/USA Hockey Magazine poll. As the 2021–22 season progressed, rankings were updated weekly.

== Legend ==
	Increase in ranking
	Decrease in ranking
	Not ranked previous week
Italics	Number of first place votes
(#-#)	Win–loss–tie record
т	Tied with team above or below also with this symbol

== USCHO ==
	Preseason Sep 27	Week 1 Oct 4	Week 2 Oct 11	Week 3 Oct 18	Week 4 Oct 25	Week 5 Nov 1	Week 6 Nov 8	Week 7 Nov 15	Week 8 Nov 22	Week 9 Nov 29	Week 10 Dec 6	Week 11 Dec 13	Week 12 Jan 3	Week 13 Jan 10	Week 14 Jan 17	Week 15 Jan 24	Week 16 Jan 31	Week 17 Feb 7	Week 18 Feb 14	Week 19 Feb 21	Week 20 Feb 28	Week 21 Mar 7	Week 22 Mar 14	Week 23 Mar 21	Final Apr 11	
1.	Massachusetts (19)	Minnesota State (2–0–0) (24)	Minnesota State (3–1–0) (17)	Michigan (4–0–0) (45)	St. Cloud State (6–2–0) (22)	St. Cloud State (6–2–0) (29)	St. Cloud State (8–2–0) (42)	Michigan (10–2–0) (42)	Minnesota State (11–3–0) (38)	Minnesota Duluth (10–3–1) (33)	Minnesota State (14–4–0) (32)	Minnesota State (16–4–0) (37)	Minnesota State (18–4–0) (43)	Minnesota State (20–4–0) (42)	Quinnipiac (16–1–3) (30)	Minnesota State (23–5–0) (20)	Minnesota State (25–5–0) (29)	Minnesota State (27–5–0) (30)	Minnesota State (27–5–0) (40)	Minnesota State (29–5–0) (38)	Minnesota State (31–5–0) (48)	Minnesota State (33–5–0) (46)	Minnesota State (34–5–0) (46)	Minnesota State (35–5–0) (35)	Denver (31–9–1) (50)	1.
2.	St. Cloud State (13)	St. Cloud State (2–0–0) (18)	St. Cloud State (3–1–0) (14)	Minnesota State (4–2–0) (2)	Michigan (5–1–0) (17)	Minnesota State (6–2–0) (16)	Michigan (8–2–0) (3)	St. Cloud State (9–3–0) (4)	Minnesota Duluth (8–3–1) (5)	Minnesota State (12–4–0) (6)	Quinnipiac (12–1–3) (15)	Quinnipiac (14–1–3) (12)	Quinnipiac (14–1–3) (7)	Quinnipiac (14–1–3) (5)	Minnesota State (21–5–0) (15)	Quinnipiac (18–2–3) (18)	Quinnipiac (21–2–3) (14)	Quinnipiac (23–2–3) (12)	Michigan (23–7–1) (8)	Michigan (25–7–1) (10)	Minnesota (23–11–0) (1)	Minnesota (23–11–0) (1)	Minnesota (24–11–0) (1)	Michigan (29–9–1) (14)	Minnesota State (38–6–0)	2.
3.	Michigan (11)	Michigan (0–0–0) (8)	Michigan (2–0–0) (16)	St. Cloud State (4–2–0) (1)	Minnesota State (4–2–0) (8)	Michigan (6–2–0)	Minnesota State (7–3–0) (2)	Minnesota State (9–3–0) (4)	Quinnipiac (10–1–3) (6)	Michigan (12–4–0) (5)	Michigan (13–5–0)	Michigan (14–6–0)	Western Michigan (14–5–0)	Western Michigan (14–5–0)	Michigan (18–6–1) (4)	Western Michigan (16–5–0) (8)	Michigan (21–7–1) (6)	Denver (20–5–1) (4)	Denver (21–6–1) (2)	Denver (22–7–1) (2)	Denver (23–8–1)	Denver (25–8–1) (1)	Denver (27–8–1) (1)	Denver (27–9–1)	Michigan (31–10–1)	3.
4.	Minnesota (2)	Minnesota (0–0–0) (1)	Minnesota (2–0–0) (1)	Minnesota (3–1–0) (1)	Minnesota Duluth (5–1–0) (3)	Minnesota Duluth (5–1–0) (3)	Minnesota Duluth (6–2–0) (1)	Minnesota Duluth (7–2–1)	Michigan (10–4–0) (1)	Quinnipiac (10–1–3) (6)	Western Michigan (12–4–0) (1)	Western Michigan (13–5–0)	St. Cloud State (12–6–0)	Michigan (16–6–1) (3)	Western Michigan (14–5–0)	Michigan (19–7–1) (3)	Denver (18–5–1) (1)	Michigan (21–7–1) (4)	Quinnipiac (25–3–3)	Minnesota (21–11–0)	North Dakota (21–11–0)	Michigan (27–9–1) (1)	Michigan (28–9–1) (1)	Western Michigan (25–11–1)	Minnesota (26–13–0)	4.
5.	Minnesota State (1)	Minnesota Duluth (0–0–0)	Minnesota Duluth (2–0–0) (1)	Minnesota Duluth (3–1–0)	Quinnipiac (3–1–1)	Minnesota (5–3–0) (1)	Quinnipiac (7–1–2)	Quinnipiac (9–1–2)	St. Cloud State (9–5–0)	St. Cloud State (9–5–0)	Minnesota Duluth (10–5–1) (1)	North Dakota (13–6–0)	North Dakota (13–6–0)	St. Cloud State (12–6–0)	Denver (14–5–1) (1)	Denver (16–5–1) (1)	Western Michigan (17–6–0)	Western Michigan (19–6–0)	Minnesota (19–11–0)	Quinnipiac (26–4–3)	Michigan (25–9–1)	North Dakota (22–12–0)	North Dakota (22–12–0)	Minnesota (24–12–0)	Minnesota Duluth (22–16–4)	5.
6.	Minnesota Duluth (1)	Boston College (0–0–0)	Boston College (1–0–1)	North Dakota (3–1–0)	North Dakota (4–2–0)	Quinnipiac (5–1–2)	Minnesota (6–4–0)	North Dakota (8–3–0)	North Dakota (9–4–0)	Western Michigan (10–4–0)	St. Cloud State (10–6–0)	Minnesota Duluth (11–6–1)	Michigan (14–6–1)	Denver (12–5–1)	St. Cloud State (12–6–0)	St. Cloud State (14–6–0)	Minnesota Duluth (14–10–2)	Minnesota Duluth (14–10–2)	Western Michigan (19–7–1)	Western Michigan (20–8–1)	Quinnipiac (28–5–3) (1)	Quinnipiac (28–5–3) (1)	Quinnipiac (30–5–3) (1)	Minnesota Duluth (21–15–4) (1)	Western Michigan (26–12–1)	6.
7.	Boston College	Massachusetts (0–2–0)	North Dakota (2–0–0)	Quinnipiac (2–0–1)	Minnesota (3–3–0)	Providence (6–3–0)	North Dakota (6–3–0)	Minnesota (7–5–0)	Western Michigan (8–4–0)	North Dakota (10–5–0)	North Dakota (11–6–0)	St. Cloud State (10–6–0) (1)	Denver (12–5–1)	Minnesota Duluth (11–8–1)	Minnesota Duluth (12–8–2)	Minnesota Duluth (13–9–2)	St. Cloud State (14–7–1)	Minnesota (17–11–0)	Minnesota Duluth (15–11–3)	North Dakota (19–11–0)	Notre Dame (25–9–0)	Western Michigan (22–10–1)	Western Michigan (24–10–1)	North Dakota (24–13–0)	Quinnipiac (32–7–3)	7.
8.	North Dakota (2)	North Dakota (0–0–0)	Quinnipiac (1–0–1)	Denver (4–0–0) (1)	Providence (5–2–0)	North Dakota (4–3–0)	Massachusetts (6–2–0)	Massachusetts (6–3–1)	Notre Dame (10–3–0)	Notre Dame (10–3–0)	Notre Dame (11–4–0)	Denver (11–5–0)	Minnesota Duluth (11–8–1)	Minnesota (12–8–0)	Cornell (12–3–1)	Cornell (13–4–1)	Minnesota (15–11–0)	Ohio State (21–7–2)	St. Cloud State (15–9–3)	Minnesota Duluth (15–13–3)	Western Michigan (20–10–1)	Notre Dame (27–10–0)	Minnesota Duluth (19–15–4)	Quinnipiac (31–6–3)	Notre Dame (28–12–0)	8.
9.	Quinnipiac	Quinnipiac (0–0–0)	Massachusetts (0–2–0)	Massachusetts (2–2–0)	Boston College (3–2–1)	Omaha (7–1–0)	Western Michigan (6–2–0)	Omaha (9–3–0)	Omaha (11–3–0)	Cornell (8–1–0)	Cornell (9–1–1)	Cornell (9–1–1)	Minnesota (10–8–0)	Cornell (11–3–1)	North Dakota (13–8–0)	Massachusetts (12–6–2)	Ohio State (19–7–2)	Massachusetts (15–8–2)	North Dakota (17–11–0)	Notre Dame (23–9–0)	Massachusetts (19–10–2)	St. Cloud State (18–12–4)	Notre Dame (27–11–0)	Notre Dame (27–11–0)	North Dakota (24–14–0)	9.
10.	Boston University	Boston University (0–0–0)	Providence (3–0–0)	Boston College (2–1–1)	Omaha (5–1–0)	Western Michigan (5–1–0)	Harvard (4–0–0) (2)	Cornell (5–1–0)	Cornell (7–1–0)	Omaha (11–3–0)	Minnesota (10–8–0) (1)	Notre Dame (12–5–0)	Massachusetts (9–4–2)	North Dakota (13–8–0)	UMass Lowell (13–3–3)	Minnesota (14–10–0)	Massachusetts (13–8–2)	St. Cloud State (14–9–1)	Massachusetts (16–9–2)	Massachusetts (17–10–2)	St. Cloud State (17–11–4)	Minnesota Duluth (17–15–4)	Northeastern (25–11–1)	Massachusetts (22–12–2)	Massachusetts (22–13–2)	10.
11.	Wisconsin	Providence (1–0–0)	Denver (2–0–0) (1)	Omaha (5–1–0)	Denver (4–2–0)	Denver (4–2–0)	Omaha (8–2–0)	Denver (6–4–0)	Minnesota (8–6–0)	Minnesota (9–7–0)	Denver (10–4–0)	Minnesota (10–8–0)	Northeastern (13–4–1)	Northeastern (15–4–1)	Minnesota (13–9–0)	Notre Dame (17–7–0)	Cornell (13–4–3)	Notre Dame (20–8–0)	Ohio State (21–9–2)	St. Cloud State (15–11–3)	Minnesota Duluth (16–14–4)	Northeastern (24–11–1)	Massachusetts (20–12–2)	St. Cloud State (18–14–4)	St. Cloud State (18–15–4)	11.
12.	Providence	Denver (0–0–0) (1)	Boston University (1–1–0)	Providence (3–2–0)	Massachusetts (2–2–0)	Massachusetts (4–2–0)	Providence (6–5–0)	Providence (8–5–0)	Denver (8–4–0)	Denver (8–4–0)	Massachusetts (8–4–2)	Massachusetts (9–4–2)	UMass Lowell (11–3–3)	UMass Lowell (11–3–3)	Northeastern (15–5–1)	Ohio State (18–7–1)	North Dakota (14–10–0)	North Dakota (15–11–0)	Notre Dame (21–9–0)	Ohio State (21–11–2)	Ohio State (21–11–2)	Massachusetts (19–12–2)	St. Cloud State (18–14–4)	Northeastern (25–12–1)	UMass Lowell (21–11–3)	12.
13.	Denver (1)	Wisconsin (0–0–0)	Omaha (3–1–0)	Notre Dame (3–0–0)	Western Michigan (3–1–0)	Harvard (2–0–0) (1)	Cornell (3–1–0)	Western Michigan (6–4–0)	Massachusetts (7–4–1)	Providence (12–5–0)	Northeastern (13–4–1)	Northeastern (13–4–1)	Notre Dame (13–6–0)	Notre Dame (15–6–0)	Notre Dame (16–7–0)	North Dakota (13–10–0)	Notre Dame (18–8–0)	UMass Lowell (16–6–3)	Northeastern (19–8–1)	Boston University (17–10–3)	Northeastern (22–10–1)	Michigan Tech (21–11–3)	UMass Lowell (21–9–3)	UMass Lowell (21–10–3)	Northeastern (25–13–1)	13.
14.	Bemidji State	Harvard (0–0–0)	Harvard (0–0–0)	Harvard (0–0–0)	Notre Dame (4–1–0)	Boston College (4–3–1)	Denver (4–4–0)	Notre Dame (8–3–0)	Providence (10–5–0)	Massachusetts (7–4–1)	Omaha (12–4–0)	Omaha (13–5–0)	Cornell (9–3–1)	Massachusetts (10–6–2)	Massachusetts (10–6–2)	UMass Lowell (13–5–3)	UMass Lowell (14–6–3)	Michigan Tech (16–8–2)	Michigan Tech (18–9–2)	Michigan Tech (19–9–3)	Boston University (18–11–3)	UMass Lowell (20–9–3)	Clarkson (21–9–6)	Michigan Tech (21–12–3)	Michigan Tech (21–13–3)	14.
15.	Cornell	Bemidji State (0–0–0)	Cornell (0–0–0)	Cornell (0–0–0)	Harvard (0–0–0)	Cornell (2–0–0)	Notre Dame (6–3–0)	UMass Lowell (6–1–2)	UMass Lowell (7–2–2)	UMass Lowell (8–2–2)	UMass Lowell (8–3–3)	UMass Lowell (10–3–3)	Omaha (14–6–0)	Omaha (14–6–0)	Ohio State (16–7–1)	Northeastern (16–7–1)	Michigan Tech (14–8–1)	Northeastern (17–8–1)	Clarkson (17–7–6)	Northeastern (20–10–1)	Michigan Tech (19–11–3)	Ohio State (22–13–2)	Michigan Tech (21–12–3)	Harvard (21–10–3)	Harvard (21–11–3)	15.
16.	Harvard	Cornell (0–0–0)	Michigan Tech (2–0–0)	Boston University (2–2–0)	Cornell (0–0–0)	Penn State (6–1–0)	Boston College (5–4–1)	Harvard (4–2–1)	Harvard (4–2–1)	Northeastern (11–4–1)	Providence (12–7–0)	Providence (14–7–0)	Providence (15–7–1)	Ohio State (15–6–1)	Omaha (14–8–0)	Omaha (15–9–0)	Northeastern (16–8–1)	Cornell (13–6–4)	UMass Lowell (16–8–3)	UMass Lowell (17–9–3)	UMass Lowell (18–9–3)	Boston University (19–12–3)	Ohio State (22–13–2)	Ohio State (22–13–2)	Ohio State (22–13–2)	16.
17.	Omaha	Omaha (0–0–0)	Notre Dame (1–0–0)	Western Michigan (2–0–0)	Bemidji State (3–3–0)	Notre Dame (4–3–0)	Northeastern (7–3–0)	Ohio State (7–3–0)	Ohio State (7–3–0)	Harvard (5–3–1)	Ohio State (9–5–0)	Ohio State (10–6–0)	Ohio State (14–6–0)	Providence (15–7–1)	Michigan Tech (12–8–1)	Providence (16–9–2)	Providence (17–10–2)	Providence (18–11–2)	Boston University (16–10–3)	Clarkson (18–8–6)	Cornell (17–8–4)	Clarkson (19–9–6)	Harvard (19–10–3)	Clarkson (21–10–6)	Clarkson (21–10–6)	17.
18.	Notre Dame	Northeastern (1–0–0)	Northeastern (2–1–0)	Michigan Tech (2–1–0)	Michigan Tech (2–1–0)	Michigan Tech (3–2–0)	Ohio State (6–2–0)	Northeastern (8–4–0)	Northeastern (9–4–1)	Ohio State (8–4–0)	Clarkson (9–4–4)	Michigan Tech (10–7–0)	Boston College (10–5–3)	Harvard (8–4–1)	Providence (15–9–1)	Michigan Tech (12–8–1)	Omaha (16–10–0)	Omaha (17–11–0)	Cornell (14–7–4)	Cornell (15–8–4)	Clarkson (19–9–6)	Cornell (17–8–4)	Boston University (19–13–3)	AIC (22–12–3)	AIC (22–13–3)	18.
19.	Clarkson	Notre Dame (0–0–0)	Western Michigan (2–0–0)	Bemidji State (1–3–0)	Boston University (3–3–0)	UMass Lowell (4–1–1)	Penn State (6–3–0)	Boston College (6–5–1)	Boston College (7–5–2)	Clarkson (8–4–3)	Northern Michigan (10–6–1)	Harvard (6–4–1)	Harvard (7–4–1)	Michigan Tech (10–8–1)	Northern Michigan (13–9–1)	Merrimack (12–10–1)	Boston University (13–10–3)	Clarkson (15–7–6)	Providence (18–12–2)	Connecticut (17–12–0) т	Providence (21–13–2)	Omaha (21–15–0)	Connecticut (19–15–0)	Connecticut (20–16–0)	Connecticut (20–16–0)	19.
20.	AIC	Clarkson (0–0–0)	Bemidji State (0–2–0)	Northeastern (2–2–0)	Northeastern (3–2–0)	Bemidji State (4–4–0)	UMass Lowell (4–1–2)	Bemidji State (6–4–0)	Bemidji State (7–5–0)	Boston College (7–5–2)	Harvard (6–4–1)	Boston College (8–5–3)	Michigan Tech (10–8–1)	Boston College (10–6–3)	Harvard (8–5–1)	Northern Michigan (13–9–1)	Clarkson (13–7–6)	Boston University (14–10–3)	Connecticut (16–11–0)	Providence (19–13–2) т	Omaha (20–14–0)	Providence (21–13–2)	Providence (22–14–2)	Providence (22–14–2)	Providence (22–14–2)	20.
	Preseason Sep 27	Week 1 Oct 4	Week 2 Oct 11	Week 3 Oct 18	Week 4 Oct 25	Week 5 Nov 1	Week 6 Nov 8	Week 7 Nov 15	Week 8 Nov 22	Week 9 Nov 29	Week 10 Dec 6	Week 11 Dec 13	Week 12 Jan 3	Week 13 Jan 10	Week 14 Jan 17	Week 15 Jan 24	Week 16 Jan 31	Week 17 Feb 7	Week 18 Feb 14	Week 19 Feb 21	Week 20 Feb 28	Week 21 Mar 7	Week 22 Mar 14	Week 23 Mar 21	Final Apr 11	
		Dropped: AIC	Dropped: Wisconsin; Clarkson	None	None	Dropped: Boston University; Northeastern	Dropped: Michigan Tech; Bemidji State	Dropped: Penn State	None	Dropped: Bemidji State	Dropped: Boston College	Dropped: Clarkson; Northern Michigan	None	None	Dropped: Boston College	Dropped: Harvard	Dropped: Merrimack; Northern Michigan	None	Dropped: Omaha	None	Dropped: Connecticut	None	Dropped: Cornell; Omaha	Dropped: Boston University	None	

== USA Today ==
	Preseason Sep 27	Week 1 Oct 4	Week 2 Oct 11	Week 3 Oct 18	Week 4 Oct 25	Week 5 Nov 1	Week 6 Nov 8	Week 7 Nov 15	Week 8 Nov 22	Week 9 Nov 29	Week 10 Dec 6	Week 11 Dec 13	Week 12 Jan 3	Week 13 Jan 10	Week 14 Jan 17	Week 15 Jan 24	Week 16 Jan 31	Week 17 Feb 7	Week 18 Feb 14	Week 19 Feb 21	Week 20 Feb 28	Week 21 Mar 7	Week 22 Mar 14	Week 23 Mar 21	Week 24 Mar 28	Final Apr 11	
1.	Massachusetts (14)	St. Cloud State (2–0–0) (16)	Minnesota State (3–1–0) (10)	Michigan (4–0–0) (34)	St. Cloud State (6–2–0) (17)	St. Cloud State (6–2–0) (21)	St. Cloud State (8–2–0) (30)	Michigan (10–2–0) (24)	Minnesota State (11–3–0) (25)	Minnesota Duluth (10–3–1) (22)	Minnesota State (14–4–0) (15)	Minnesota State (16–4–0) (21)	Minnesota State (18–4–0) (28)	Minnesota State (20–4–0) (27)	Quinnipiac (16–1–3) (19)	Minnesota State (23–5–0) (24)	Minnesota State (25–5–0) (25)	Minnesota State (27–5–0) (22)	Minnesota State (27–5–0) (28)	Minnesota State (29–5–0) (29)	Minnesota State (31–5–0) (32)	Minnesota State (33–5–0) (31)	Minnesota State (34–5–0) (30)	Minnesota State (35–5–0) (20)	Minnesota State (37–5–0) (22)	Denver (31–9–1) (34)	1.
2.	Michigan (4)	Minnesota State (2–0–0) (9)	St. Cloud State (3–1–0) (11)	Minnesota State (4–2–0)	Minnesota State (4–2–0) (6)	Minnesota State (6–2–0) (9)	Michigan (8–2–0)	St. Cloud State (9–3–0) (4)	Minnesota Duluth (8–3–1) (3)	Michigan (12–4–0) (3)	Quinnipiac (12–1–3) (13)	Quinnipiac (14–1–3) (12)	Quinnipiac (14–1–3) (5)	Quinnipiac (14–1–3) (6)	Minnesota State (21–5–0) (9)	Quinnipiac (18–2–3) (5)	Quinnipiac (21–2–3) (5)	Quinnipiac (23–2–3) (8)	Michigan (23–7–1) (5)	Michigan (25–7–1) (4)	Minnesota (23–11–0) (2)	Minnesota (23–11–0)	Denver (27–8–1) (4)	Michigan (29–9–1) (13)	Michigan (31–9–1) (7)	Minnesota State (38–6–0)	2.
3.	St. Cloud State (2)	Michigan (0–0–0) (6)	Michigan (2–0–0) (9)	St. Cloud State (4–2–0)	Michigan (5–1–0) (6)	Minnesota Duluth (5–1–0) (2)	Minnesota State (7–3–0) (1)	Minnesota State (9–3–0) (3)	Michigan (10–4–0) (3)	Minnesota State (12–4–0) (5)	Michigan (13–5–0) (1)	Michigan (14–6–0)	Western Michigan (14–5–0)	Western Michigan (14–5–0)	Western Michigan (14–5–0)	Western Michigan (14–5–0) (3)	Denver (18–5–1) (3)	Denver (20–5–1) (3)	Denver (21–6–1) (1)	Denver (22–7–1) (1)	Denver (23–8–1)	Denver (25–8–1) (3)	Minnesota (24–11–0)	Minnesota Duluth (21–15–4) (1)	Denver (29–9–1) (5)	Michigan (31–10–1)	3.
4.	Minnesota (7)	Minnesota (0–0–0) (3)	Minnesota (2–0–0)	Minnesota (3–1–0)	Minnesota Duluth (5–1–0) (5)	Michigan (6–2–0)	Minnesota Duluth (6–1–0) (1)	Minnesota Duluth (7–2–1) (2)	Quinnipiac (10–1–3) (2)	Quinnipiac (10–1–3) (4)	Western Michigan (12–4–0) (1)	Western Michigan (13–5–0) (1)	St. Cloud State (12–6–0)	St. Cloud State (12–6–0)	Michigan (18–6–1) (4)	Michigan (19–7–1)	Michigan (21–7–1) (1)	Michigan (21–7–1) (1)	Quinnipiac (25–3–3)	Minnesota (21–11–0)	Michigan (25–9–1)	Michigan (27–9–1)	Michigan (28–9–1)	Denver (27–9–1)	Minnesota (26–12–0)	Minnesota (26–13–0)	4.
5.	Minnesota State	Minnesota Duluth (0–0–0)	Minnesota Duluth (2–0–0)	Minnesota Duluth (3–1–0)	Quinnipiac (3–1–1)	Minnesota (5–3–0) (1)	Quinnipiac (7–1–2)	Quinnipiac (9–1–2) (1)	North Dakota (9–4–0)	Western Michigan (10–4–0)	Minnesota Duluth (10–5–1) (3)	Minnesota Duluth (11–6–1) т	North Dakota (13–6–0)	Michigan (16–6–1)	St. Cloud State (12–6–0)	Denver (16–5–1) (2)	Western Michigan (17–6–0)	Western Michigan (19–6–0)	Western Michigan (19–7–1)	Quinnipiac (26–4–3)	North Dakota (21–11–1)	North Dakota (22–12–1)	North Dakota (24–12–1)	Western Michigan (25–11–1)	Western Michigan (26–12–1)	Minnesota Duluth (22–16–4)	5.
6.	Minnesota Duluth	Massachusetts (0–2–0)	North Dakota (2–0–0)	North Dakota (3–1–0)	North Dakota (4–2–0)	Quinnipiac (5–1–2)	Harvard (4–0–0) (2)	North Dakota (8–3–0)	St. Cloud State (9–5–0)	St. Cloud State (9–5–0)	St. Cloud State (10–6–0)	North Dakota (13–6–0) т	Denver (12–5–1) (1)	Denver (12–5–1) (1)	Denver (14–5–1) (2)	St. Cloud State (14–6–0)	St. Cloud State (14–7–0)	Minnesota Duluth (14–10–2)	Minnesota (19–11–0)	Western Michigan (20–8–1)	Quinnipiac (28–5–3)	Quinnipiac (28–5–3)	Quinnipiac (30–5–3)	Minnesota (24–12–0)	Minnesota Duluth (21–16–4)	Western Michigan (26–12–1)	6.
7.	North Dakota	North Dakota (0–0–0)	Boston College (1–0–1)	Quinnipiac (2–0–1)	Minnesota (3–3–0)	Omaha (7–1–0)	North Dakota (6–3–0)	Minnesota (7–5–0)	Western Michigan (8–4–0) (1)	North Dakota (10–5–0)	North Dakota (11–6–0)	St. Cloud State (10–6–0)	Michigan (14–6–1)	Minnesota Duluth (11–8–1)	Minnesota Duluth (12–8–2)	Minnesota Duluth (13–9–2)	Minnesota Duluth (14–10–2)	Ohio State (21–7–2)	Minnesota Duluth (15–11–3)	North Dakota (19–11–1)	Notre Dame (25–9–0)	Western Michigan (22–10–1)	Western Michigan (24–10–1)	Quinnipiac (31–6–3)	Quinnipiac (32–7–3)	Quinnipiac (32–7–3)	7.
8.	Boston College	Boston College (0–0–0)	Quinnipiac (1–0–1)	Denver (4–0–0)	Providence (5–2–0)	Providence (6–3–0)	Minnesota (6–4–0)	Massachusetts (6–3–1)	Notre Dame (10–3–0)	Notre Dame (10–3–0)	Notre Dame (11–4–0)	Denver (11–5–0)	Minnesota Duluth (11–8–1)	Minnesota (12–8–0)	Cornell (12–3–1)	Massachusetts (12–6–2)	Ohio State (19–7–2)	Minnesota (17–11–0)	St. Cloud State (14–9–1)	Notre Dame (23–9–0)	Western Michigan (20–10–1)	Notre Dame (27–10–0)	Minnesota Duluth (19–15–4)	North Dakota (24–13–1)	Notre Dame (28–12–0)	Notre Dame (28–12–0)	8.
9.	Quinnipiac	Quinnipiac (0–0–0)	Massachusetts (0–2–0)	Massachusetts (2–2–0)	Omaha (5–1–0)	Harvard (2–0–0) (1)	Massachusetts (6–2–0)	Cornell (5–1–0)	Omaha (11–3–0)	Cornell (8–1–0)	Cornell (9–1–1)	Cornell (9–1–1)	Massachusetts (9–4–2)	Northeastern (15–4–1)	UMass Lowell (13–3–3)	Cornell (13–4–1)	Massachusetts (13–8–2)	Massachusetts (15–8–2)	Massachusetts (16–9–2)	Minnesota Duluth (15–13–3)	Massachusetts (19–10–2)	St. Cloud State (18–12–4)	Notre Dame (27–11–0)	Massachusetts (22–12–2)	North Dakota (24–14–1)	North Dakota (24–14–1)	9.
10.	Boston University	Boston University (0–0–0)	Providence (3–0–0)	Boston College (2–1–1)	Massachusetts (2–2–0)	North Dakota (4–3–0)	Western Michigan (6–2–0)	Omaha (9–3–0)	Cornell (7–1–0)	Omaha (11–3–0)	Denver (10–4–0)	Notre Dame (12–5–0)	Northeastern (13–4–1)	Cornell (11–3–1)	North Dakota (13–8–0)	Minnesota (14–10–0)	Minnesota (15–11–0)	St. Cloud State (14–9–1)	North Dakota (17–11–1)	Massachusetts (17–10–2)	Minnesota Duluth (16–14–3)	Minnesota Duluth (17–15–4)	St. Cloud State (18–14–4)	Notre Dame (27–11–0)	Massachusetts (22–13–2)	Massachusetts (22–13–2)	10.
11.	Harvard	Providence (1–0–0)	Denver (2–0–0)	Omaha (5–1–0)	Western Michigan (3–1–0)	Western Michigan (5–1–0)	Omaha (8–2–0)	Providence (8–5–0)	Denver (8–4–0)	Denver (8–4–0)	Minnesota (10–8–0) (1)	Minnesota (10–8–0)	Minnesota (10–8–0)	North Dakota (13–8–0)	Minnesota (13–9–0)	Ohio State (18–7–1)	North Dakota (14–10–1)	Notre Dame (20–8–0)	Notre Dame (21–9–0)	St. Cloud State (15–11–3)	St. Cloud State (17–11–4)	Northeastern (24–11–1)	Northeastern (25–11–1)	St. Cloud State (18–14–4)	St. Cloud State (18–15–4)	St. Cloud State (18–15–4)	11.
12.	Wisconsin	Harvard (0–0–0)	Harvard (0–0–0)	Notre Dame (3–0–0)	Denver (4–2–0)	Massachusetts (4–2–0)	Cornell (3–1–0)	Denver (6–4–0)	Minnesota (8–6–0)	Minnesota (9–7–0)	Massachusetts (8–4–2)	Massachusetts (9–4–2)	UMass Lowell (11–3–3)	UMass Lowell (11–3–3)	Massachusetts (10–6–2)	Notre Dame (17–7–0)	Notre Dame (18–8–0)	North Dakota (15–11–1)	Ohio State (21–9–2)	Ohio State (21–11–2)	Ohio State (21–11–2)	Massachusetts (19–12–2)	Massachusetts (20–12–2)	Northeastern (25–12–1)	UMass Lowell (21–11–3)	Northeastern (25–13–1)	12.
13.	Cornell	Denver (0–0–0)	Cornell (0–0–0)	Harvard (0–0–0)	Boston College (3–2–1)	Denver (4–2–0)	Providence (6–5–0)	Western Michigan (6–4–0)	Massachusetts (7–4–1)	Providence (12–5–0)	Northeastern (13–4–1)	Northeastern (13–4–1)	Notre Dame (13–6–0)	Notre Dame (15–6–0)	Northeastern (15–5–1)	North Dakota (13–10–0)	Cornell (13–4–3)	UMass Lowell (16–6–3)	Michigan Tech (18–9–2)	Michigan Tech (19–9–3)	Northeastern (22–10–1)	Michigan Tech (21–11–3)	UMass Lowell (21–9–3)	UMass Lowell (21–10–3)	Northeastern (25–13–1)	UMass Lowell (21–11–3)	13.
14.	Providence	Wisconsin (0–0–0)	Omaha (3–1–0)	Providence (3–2–0)	Harvard (0–0–0)	Cornell (2–0–0)	Ohio State (6–2–0)	Harvard (4–2–1)	Providence (10–5–0)	Massachusetts (7–4–1)	Omaha (12–4–0)	UMass Lowell (10–3–3)	Cornell (9–3–1)	Massachusetts (10–6–2)	Notre Dame (16–7–0)	UMass Lowell (13–5–3)	Michigan Tech (14–8–1)	Michigan Tech (16–8–2)	Northeastern (19–8–1)	Boston University (17–10–3)	Boston University (18–11–3)	UMass Lowell (20–9–3)	Michigan Tech (21–12–3)	Michigan Tech (21–12–3)	Michigan Tech (21–13–3)	Michigan Tech (21–13–3)	14.
15.	Bemidji State	Omaha (0–0–0)	Boston University (1–1–0)	Cornell (0–0–0)	Cornell (0–0–0)	Boston College (4–3–1)	Notre Dame (6–3–0)	Notre Dame (8–3–0)	Harvard (4–2–1)	UMass Lowell (8–2–2)	UMass Lowell (8–3–3)	Omaha (13–5–0)	Omaha (14–6–0)	Ohio State (15–6–1)	Ohio State (16–7–1)	Northeastern (16–7–1)	UMass Lowell (14–6–3)	Cornell (13–6–4)	Clarkson (17–7–5)	Northeastern (20–10–1)	Michigan Tech (19–11–3)	Ohio State (22–13–2)	Clarkson (21–9–6)	Harvard (21–10–3)	Harvard (21–11–3)	Harvard (21–11–3)	15.
	Preseason Sep 27	Week 1 Oct 4	Week 2 Oct 11	Week 3 Oct 18	Week 4 Oct 25	Week 5 Nov 1	Week 6 Nov 8	Week 7 Nov 15	Week 8 Nov 22	Week 9 Nov 29	Week 10 Dec 6	Week 11 Dec 13	Week 12 Jan 3	Week 13 Jan 10	Week 14 Jan 17	Week 15 Jan 24	Week 16 Jan 31	Week 17 Feb 7	Week 18 Feb 14	Week 19 Feb 21	Week 20 Feb 28	Week 21 Mar 7	Week 22 Mar 14	Week 23 Mar 21	Week 24 Mar 28	Final Apr 11	
		Dropped: Cornell; Bemidji State	Dropped: Wisconsin	Dropped: Boston University	Dropped: Notre Dame	None	Dropped: Denver; Boston College	Dropped: Ohio State	None	Dropped: Harvard	Dropped: Providence	None	None	Dropped: Omaha	None	None	Dropped: Northeastern	None	Dropped: UMass Lowell; Cornell	Dropped: Clarkson	None	Dropped: Boston University	Dropped: Ohio State	Dropped: Clarkson	None	None	
