= 2022–23 Atlantic Hockey season =

- Season: 2022–23
- Conference: Atlantic Hockey
- Division: Division I
- Sport: Ice hockey
- Duration: October 1, 2022– March 23, 2023
- Number of teams: 10
- TV partner(s): FloSports

Regular season
- Season champions: RIT
- Season MVP: Carter Wilkie
- Top scorer: Eric Esposito

Atlantic Hockey Tournament
- Tournament champions: Canisius
- Runners-up: Holy Cross
- Tournament MVP: Jacob Barczewski
- Top scorer: Liam McLinskey (9)

NCAA tournament
- Bids: 1
- Record: 0–1
- Best Finish: Regional Semifinal
- Team(s): Canisius

The 2022–23 Atlantic Hockey season was the 20th season of play for Atlantic Hockey and took place during the 2022–23 NCAA Division I men's ice hockey season. The regular season began on October 1, 2022, and concluded on February 25, 2023, with the RIT Tigers finishing with the best record. The postseason tournament began on March 3, 2023, and ended with the championship game on March 23, 2023, won by the Canisius Golden Griffins.

== Coaches ==
=== Records ===
Team	Head coach	Season at school	Record at school	Atlantic Hockey record
Air Force	Frank Serratore	26	426–395–96	222–141–67
American International	Eric Lang	7	104–86–17	85–50–15
Army	Brian Riley	19	218–317–86	179–223–79
Bentley	Ryan Soderquist	21	266–356–83	201–220–74
Canisius	Trevor Large	6	68–78–16	55–55–12
Holy Cross	Bill Riga	2	12–23–2	11–14–2
Mercyhurst	Rick Gotkin	35	588–478–100	244–198–60
Niagara	Jason Lammers	6	58–93–18	46–61–18
RIT	Wayne Wilson	24	409–290–77	228–146–53
Sacred Heart	C. J. Marottolo	14	157–255–49	126–176–41

== Standings ==
2022–23 Atlantic Hockey Standings
	Conference record										Overall record					
	GP	W	L	T	OW	OL	SW	PTS	GF	GA	GP	W	L	T	GF	GA
RIT †	26	18	7	1	1	3	0	57	85	55	39	25	13	1	127	100
American International	26	14	8	4	2	0	3	47	87	62	39	18	14	7	124	98
Sacred Heart	26	14	9	3	2	0	2	45	87	72	37	17	17	3	107	112
Canisius *	26	13	10	3	3	1	1	41	76	71	42	20	19	3	118	119
Army	26	12	12	2	3	3	1	39	72	81	37	14	19	4	98	119
Niagara	26	10	13	3	0	3	2	38	73	86	40	19	18	3	119	129
Holy Cross	26	12	12	2	3	1	1	37	73	71	41	17	21	3	98	119
Mercyhurst	26	9	14	3	1	5	1	35	77	80	36	10	23	3	98	122
Bentley	26	8	16	2	1	1	1	27	61	89	34	11	21	2	81	124
Air Force	26	8	17	1	1	0	0	24	63	87	36	12	22	2	95	128
Championship: March 18, 2023 † indicates conference regular season champion (DeGregorio Trophy) * indicates conference tournament champion (Riley Trophy); Rankings: USCHO.com Top 20 Poll

== Non-Conference record ==
Of the sixteen teams that are selected to participate in the NCAA tournament, ten were via at-large bids. Those 10 teams are determined based upon the PairWise rankings, which take into account all games played but are heavily affected by intra-conference results. As a result, teams from leagues which perform better in non-conference are much more likely to receive at-large bids even if they possess inferior records overall. Atlantic Hockey produced another poor non-conference season, as just one team finished with a winning record (Niagara) and while some were near .500, most finished well below average in non-league games, including the conference as a whole. They did manage a winning mark against Independent teams, however, many of those victories came against Lindenwood in its first season of varsity play.

=== Regular season record ===
Team	Big Ten	CCHA	ECAC Hockey	Hockey East	Independent	NCHC	Total
Air Force	0–0–1	0–0–0	0–0–0	0–2–0	3–2–0	1–1–0	4–5–1
American International	0–0–0	0–0–0	0–1–1	1–2–1	2–1–1	0–0–0	3–4–3
Army	0–0–0	0–0–0	1–2–1	0–1–1	0–2–0	0–0–0	1–5–2
Bentley	0–2–0	0–0–0	0–1–0	2–1–0	1–1–0	0–0–0	3–5–0
Canisius	0–2–0	1–1–0	1–0–0	0–1–0	0–0–0	0–2–0	2–6–0
Holy Cross	0–0–0	0–0–0	0–2–1	1–2–0	0–0–0	0–2–0	1–6–1
Mercyhurst	0–4–0	0–0–0	1–3–0	0–0–0	0–0–0	0–0–0	1–7–0
Niagara	0–0–0	0–0–0	3–1–0	0–0–0	0–0–0	3–1–0	6–2–0
RIT	0–2–0	0–0–0	2–2–0	0–0–0	2–0–0	0–0–0	4–4–0
Sacred Heart	0–0–0	0–0–0	1–2–0	1–4–0	0–0–0	0–0–0	2–6–0
Overall	0–10–1	1–1–0	9–14–3	5–13–2	8–6–1	4–6–0	27–50–7

== Statistics ==
=== Leading scorers ===
GP = Games played; G = Goals; A = Assists; Pts = Points; PIM = Penalty minutes

Player	Class	Team	GP	G	A	Pts	PIM
Eric Esposito	Graduate	Mercyhurst	26	14	14	28	12
Jack Ricketts	Junior	Holy Cross	26	14	13	27	24
John Keranen	Senior	Army	25	11	16	27	34
Carter Wilkie	Sophomore	RIT	26	9	18	27	49
Keaton Mastrodonato	Senior	Canisius	26	14	12	26	26
Ryan Miotto	Senior	Canisius	26	13	13	26	21
Neil Shea	Senior	Sacred Heart	26	12	14	26	8
Aiden Hansen-Bukata	Junior	RIT	24	2	23	25	18
Gianfranco Cassaro	Senior	RIT	26	11	13	24	18
Max Itagaki	Freshman	Army	26	4	20	24	26

=== Leading goaltenders ===
Minimum 1/3 of team's minutes played in conference games.
GP = Games played; Min = Minutes played; W = Wins; L = Losses; T = Ties; GA = Goals against; SO = Shutouts; SV% = Save percentage; GAA = Goals against average

Player	Class	Team	GP	Min	W	L	T	GA	SO	SV%	GAA
Jarrett Fiske	Senior	American International	18	971:31	9	3	4	31	2	.931	1.91
Tommy Scarfone	Sophomore	RIT	23	1391:42	16	6	1	49	3	.927	2.11
Justin Evanson	Senior	Army	11	654:20	7	3	1	26	2	.921	2.38
Luke Lush	Senior	Sacred Heart	25	1449:34	12	9	3	61	1	.905	2.52
Thomas Gale	Sophomore	Holy Cross	16	901:58	3	10	2	39	1	.902	2.59

== Conference tournament ==
Teams are reseeded for the semifinals

Quarterfinals; March 3–5
1	RIT	5	4*	-
8	Mercyhurst	3	3	-
2	American International	3	3	3
7	Holy Cross	1	4	4*
3	Sacred Heart	3	1	3
6	Niagara	1	4	7
4	Canisius	5	0	3
5	Army	2	1*	0

Semifinals; March 10–12
1	RIT	0	4*	1
7	Holy Cross	1*	3	5
4	Canisius	1	5	4
6	Niagara	2	1	2

Championship; March 18
7	Holy Cross	0
4	Canisius	3

Note: * denotes overtime period(s)

== NCAA tournament ==
=== West Regional semifinal ===
March 23, 2023; 8:00 PM	(1) Minnesota	9 – 2 (1–1, 2–1, 6–0)	(4) Canisius	Scheels Arena; Attendance: 5,061

Game reference

Justen Close
Goalies
Jacob Barczewski
Referees:
Bruce Vids
Timothy Likens
Linesmen:
Matt Tyree
Eric Standke

(Koster, Brodzinski) Luke Mittelstadt (3) – PP – 06:08	1–0
	1–1	08:41 – Daniel DiGrande (12) (Decker, Bowman)
	1–2	23:23 – Nick Bowman (11) (Lambert)
(Lamb, Pitlick) Aaron Huglen (7) – 28:15	2–2
(Koster, Pitlick) Connor Kurth (7) – 38:04	3–2
(Nelson, Cooley) Jimmy Snuggerud (21) – PP – 41:10	4–2
(Faber, Kurth) Brody Lamb (4) – PP – 42:35	5–2
(Cooley, Faber) Bryce Brodzinski (16) – 50:03	6–2
(Cooley, LaCombe) Mason Nevers (10) – PP – 52:28	7–2
(J. Mittelstadt) Bryce Brodzinski (17) – 52:50	8–2
(unassisted) Bryce Brodzinski (18) – 59:05	9–2

8 min
Penalties
19 min
34
Shots
20

== Rankings ==
=== USCHO ===
Team	Pre	1	2	3	4	5	6	7	8	9	10	11	12	13	14	15	16	17	18	19	20	21	22	23	24	25	26	Final
Air Force	NR	-	NR	NR	NR	NR	NR	NR	NR	NR	NR	NR	NR	-	NR	NR	NR	NR	NR	NR	NR	NR	NR	NR	NR	NR	-	NR
American International	NR	-	NR	NR	NR	NR	NR	NR	NR	NR	NR	NR	NR	-	NR	NR	NR	NR	NR	NR	NR	NR	NR	NR	NR	NR	-	NR
Army	NR	-	NR	NR	NR	NR	NR	NR	NR	NR	NR	NR	NR	-	NR	NR	NR	NR	NR	NR	NR	NR	NR	NR	NR	NR	-	NR
Bentley	NR	-	NR	NR	NR	NR	NR	NR	NR	NR	NR	NR	NR	-	NR	NR	NR	NR	NR	NR	NR	NR	NR	NR	NR	NR	-	NR
Canisius	NR	-	NR	NR	NR	NR	NR	NR	NR	NR	NR	NR	NR	-	NR	NR	NR	NR	NR	NR	NR	NR	NR	NR	NR	NR	-	NR
Holy Cross	NR	-	NR	NR	NR	NR	NR	NR	NR	NR	NR	NR	NR	-	NR	NR	NR	NR	NR	NR	NR	NR	NR	NR	NR	NR	-	NR
Mercyhurst	NR	-	NR	NR	NR	NR	NR	NR	NR	NR	NR	NR	NR	-	NR	NR	NR	NR	NR	NR	NR	NR	NR	NR	NR	NR	-	NR
Niagara	NR	-	NR	NR	NR	NR	NR	NR	NR	NR	NR	NR	NR	-	NR	NR	NR	NR	NR	NR	NR	NR	NR	NR	NR	NR	-	NR
RIT	NR	-	NR	NR	NR	NR	NR	NR	20	NR	20	20	20	-	NR	NR	20	19	18	18	NR	NR	NR	20	NR	NR	-	NR
Sacred Heart	NR	-	NR	NR	NR	NR	NR	NR	NR	NR	NR	NR	NR	-	NR	NR	NR	NR	NR	NR	NR	NR	NR	NR	NR	NR	-	NR

USCHO did not release a poll in weeks 1, 13 and 26.

=== USA Today ===
Team	Pre	1	2	3	4	5	6	7	8	9	10	11	12	13	14	15	16	17	18	19	20	21	22	23	24	25	26	Final
Air Force	NR	NR	NR	NR	NR	NR	NR	NR	NR	NR	NR	NR	NR	NR	NR	NR	NR	NR	NR	NR	NR	NR	NR	NR	NR	NR	NR	NR
American International	NR	NR	NR	NR	NR	NR	NR	NR	NR	NR	NR	NR	NR	NR	NR	NR	NR	NR	NR	NR	NR	NR	NR	NR	NR	NR	NR	NR
Army	NR	NR	NR	NR	NR	NR	NR	NR	NR	NR	NR	NR	NR	NR	NR	NR	NR	NR	NR	NR	NR	NR	NR	NR	NR	NR	NR	NR
Bentley	NR	NR	NR	NR	NR	NR	NR	NR	NR	NR	NR	NR	NR	NR	NR	NR	NR	NR	NR	NR	NR	NR	NR	NR	NR	NR	NR	NR
Canisius	NR	NR	NR	NR	NR	NR	NR	NR	NR	NR	NR	NR	NR	NR	NR	NR	NR	NR	NR	NR	NR	NR	NR	NR	NR	NR	NR	NR
Holy Cross	NR	NR	NR	NR	NR	NR	NR	NR	NR	NR	NR	NR	NR	NR	NR	NR	NR	NR	NR	NR	NR	NR	NR	NR	NR	NR	NR	NR
Mercyhurst	NR	NR	NR	NR	NR	NR	NR	NR	NR	NR	NR	NR	NR	NR	NR	NR	NR	NR	NR	NR	NR	NR	NR	NR	NR	NR	NR	NR
Niagara	NR	NR	NR	NR	NR	NR	NR	NR	NR	NR	NR	NR	NR	NR	NR	NR	NR	NR	NR	NR	NR	NR	NR	NR	NR	NR	NR	NR
RIT	NR	NR	NR	NR	NR	NR	NR	NR	NR	NR	NR	NR	NR	20	NR	NR	19	18	NR	18	NR	NR	NR	NR	NR	NR	NR	NR
Sacred Heart	NR	NR	NR	NR	NR	NR	NR	NR	NR	NR	NR	NR	NR	NR	NR	NR	NR	NR	NR	NR	NR	NR	NR	NR	NR	NR	NR	NR

=== Pairwise ===
Team	2	3	4	5	6	7	8	9	10	11	12	14	15	16	17	18	19	20	21	22	23	24	Final
Air Force	22	26	48	42	45	31	31	42	50	56	55	51	49	58	60	56	54	54	56	58	58	58	57
American International	18	34	16	18	18	27	35	35	39	38	32	37	42	43	39	40	36	41	36	33	35	32	35
Army	2	29	40	54	55	58	58	57	54	53	54	53	58	55	57	61	57	53	54	52	53	52	52
Bentley	22	50	30	36	43	50	52	58	55	57	58	58	58	53	57	54	58	54	54	56	55	54	54
Canisius	22	50	38	40	53	55	52	52	58	54	53	52	55	58	53	53	53	48	49	44	45	43	41
Holy Cross	22	50	53	51	51	44	44	51	57	51	50	50	52	50	51	52	49	50	48	50	47	44	47
Mercyhurst	22	47	45	53	54	56	56	48	48	48	49	48	48	49	47	48	52	56	53	54	55	54	54
Niagara	22	39	34	41	29	28	28	29	25	28	29	27	27	38	39	37	42	30	33	36	32	32	35
RIT	17	19	14	28	27	17	18	17	20	19	18	23	22	21	17	15	18	20	22	22	21	22	22
Sacred Heart	22	50	20	17	13	19	21	25	36	36	32	29	32	30	29	30	29	39	40	40	42	41	42

Note: teams ranked in the top-10 automatically qualify for the NCAA tournament. Teams ranked 11-16 can qualify based upon conference tournament results.

== Awards ==
=== NCAA ===
Award	Recipient
Derek Hines Unsung Hero Award	Noah Wilson, Army

=== Atlantic Hockey ===
Award		Recipient
Player of the Year		Carter Wilkie, RIT
Rookie of the Year		Max Itagaki, Army
Best Defensive Forward		Cody Laskosky, RIT
Best Defenseman		Aiden Hansen-Bukata, RIT
Individual Sportsmanship Award		Braeden Tuck, Sacred Heart
Team Sportsmanship Award		Sacred Heart
Regular Season Scoring Trophy		Eric Esposito, Mercyhurst
Regular Season Goaltending Award		Jarrett Fiske, American International
Coach of the Year		Wayne Wilson, RIT
All-Atlantic Hockey Teams
First Team	Position	Second Team
Tommy Scarfone, RIT	G	Jarrett Fiske, American International
Gianfranco Cassaro, RIT	D	Luke Rowe, Air Force
Aiden Hansen-Bukata, RIT	D	Brian Kramer, American International
Carter Wilkie, RIT	F	Jack Ricketts, Holy Cross
Neil Shea, Sacred Heart	F	Eric Esposito, Mercyhurst
Blake Bennett, American International	F	Joey Baez, Army
Third Team	Position	Rookie Team
Jacob Barczewski, Canisius	G	Owen Say, Mercyhurst
Nick Hale, Holy Cross	D	Chris Hedden, Air Force
Hunter Sansbury, Sacred Heart	D	Mack Oliphant, Holy Cross
Keaton Mastrodonato, Canisius	F	Max Itagaki, Army
John Keranen, Army	F	Nicholas Niemo, Bentley
Jordan Biro, American International	F	Marcus Joughin, Sacred Heart

==== Conference tournament ====
Tournament MVP
Jacob Barczewski		Canisius
All-Tournament Team
Player	Pos	Team
Jacob Barczewski	G	Canisius
Jack Robilotti	D	Holy Cross
Jackson Decker	D	Canisius
Liam McLinskey	F	Holy Cross
Keaton Mastrodonato	F	Canisius
Nick Bowman	F	Canisius
