= 2023 Atlantic Hockey men's ice hockey tournament =

- Dates: March 3–18, 2023
- Teams: 10
- Finals site: LECOM Harborcenter; Buffalo, New York
- Champions: Canisius (2nd title)
- Winning coach: Trevor Large (1st title)
- MVP: Jacob Barczewski (Canisius)
- Atlantic Hockey men's Ice Hockey Tournaments

The 2023 Atlantic Hockey Tournament was the 19th edition of the Atlantic Hockey Tournament. It was played between March 3 and March 18, 2023. By winning the tournament, Canisius earned Atlantic Hockey's automatic bid to the 2023 NCAA Division I men's ice hockey tournament.

== Format ==
The tournament featured three rounds of play. The top eight teams according to the conference standings participated. In the Quarterfinals, the 1st-seed hosted the 8th-seed, the 2nd-seed hosted the 7th-seed, the 3rd-seed hosted the 6th-seed and the 4th-seed hosted the 5th-seed in a best-of-three series. The teams that advanced out of the quarterfinals are reseeded in the Semifinal with the highest remaining seed hosting the lowest remaining seed and the second highest remaining seed hosting the second lowest remaining seed, again in a best-of-three series. The teams that advance from the Semifinals meet for a Championship game held at the home venue of the higher seed. The winner of Atlantic Hockey Tournament Championship received the conference's automatic bid to the 2023 NCAA Division I men's ice hockey tournament.

== Conference standings ==
2022–23 Atlantic Hockey Standings
	Conference record										Overall record					
	GP	W	L	T	OW	OL	SW	PTS	GF	GA	GP	W	L	T	GF	GA
RIT †	26	18	7	1	1	3	0	57	85	55	39	25	13	1	127	100
American International	26	14	8	4	2	0	3	47	87	62	39	18	14	7	124	98
Sacred Heart	26	14	9	3	2	0	2	45	87	72	37	17	17	3	107	112
Canisius *	26	13	10	3	3	1	1	41	76	71	42	20	19	3	118	119
Army	26	12	12	2	3	3	1	39	72	81	37	14	19	4	98	119
Niagara	26	10	13	3	0	3	2	38	73	86	40	19	18	3	119	129
Holy Cross	26	12	12	2	3	1	1	37	73	71	41	17	21	3	98	119
Mercyhurst	26	9	14	3	1	5	1	35	77	80	36	10	23	3	98	122
Bentley	26	8	16	2	1	1	1	27	61	89	34	11	21	2	81	124
Air Force	26	8	17	1	1	0	0	24	63	87	36	12	22	2	95	128
Championship: March 18, 2023 † indicates conference regular season champion (DeGregorio Trophy) * indicates conference tournament champion (Riley Trophy); Rankings: USCHO.com Top 20 Poll

== Bracket ==
Teams are reseeded for the semifinals

Quarterfinals; March 3–5
1	RIT	5	4*	-
8	Mercyhurst	3	3	-
2	American International	3	3	3
7	Holy Cross	1	4	4*
3	Sacred Heart	3	1	3
6	Niagara	1	4	7
4	Canisius	5	0	3
5	Army	2	1*	0

Semifinals; March 10–12
1	RIT	0	4*	1
7	Holy Cross	1*	3	5
4	Canisius	1	5	4
6	Niagara	2	1	2

Championship; March 18
7	Holy Cross	0
4	Canisius	3

Note: * denotes overtime period(s)

== Results ==
Note: All game times are local.

=== Quarterfinals ===
==== (1) RIT vs. (8) Mercyhurst ====
March 3, 2023; 7:05 PM	RIT	5–3 (1–0, 0–0, 4–3)	Mercyhurst	Gene Polisseni Center; Attendance: 2,259

Game reference

Tommy Scarfone
Goalies
Tyler Harmon
Referees:
Chris Leavitt
Jared Waitt
Linesmen:
Christopher Pike
Brian Kimmins

(Laskosky, Wilkie) Matt Kellenberger (3) – 05:15	1–0
	1–1	(Bisson, St. Onge) Carson Briere (5) – 40:23
	1–2	(Townend) Eric Esposito (16) – 41:12
(Petrucci) Adam Jeffery (1) – 42:18	2–2
	2–3	(Fedulov, Hunter) Jonathan Bendorf (4) – 46:24
(Nicholson, Gonsalves) Dimitri Mikrogiannakis (4) – 50:14	3–3
(Moretz) Adam Jeffery (2) – GW – 58:25	4–3
(Mahan, Mikrogiannakis) Grady Hobbs (8) – EN – 59:47	5–3

4 min
Penalties
4 min
52
Shots
23

March 4, 2023; 7:05 PM	RIT	4–3 (OT) (1–2, 1–1, 1–0, 1–0)	Mercyhurst	Gene Polisseni Center; Attendance: 2,901

Game reference

Tommy Scarfone
Goalies
Tyler Harmon
Referees:
Chris Leavitt
Jared Waitt
Linesmen:
Christopher Pike
Brian Kimmins

	0–1	(Townend, Dahm) Mickey Burns (11) – 04:36
(Mikrogiannakis, Moretz) Xavier Lapointe (1) – 09:18	1–1
	1–2	(Unassisted) Eric Esposito (17) – 12:37
	1–3	(St. Onge, Townend) Marko Reifenberger (6) – 25:03
(Cassaro, Wilkie) Simon Isabelle (6) – PP – 38:13	2–3
(Cassaro) Cody Laskosky (12) – 43:46	3–3
(Laskosky, Moretz) Gianfranco Cassaro (13) – PP GW – 63:09	4–3

14 min
Penalties
10 min
44
Shots
35

RIT Won Series 2–0

==== (2) American International vs. (7) Holy Cross ====
March 3, 2023; 1:05 PM	American International	3–1 (0–0, 2–0, 1–1)	Holy Cross	MassMutual Center; Attendance: 147

Game reference

Jarrett Fiske
Goalies
Jason Grande
Referees:
Brendan Blanchard
Andy Bethmann
Linesmen:
Shane Kanaly
Patrick Philbin

(Manz, Cardelli) Timofei Khokhlachev (7) – 22:37	1–0
(Geschwind, Cardelli) Jordan Biro (11) – GW – 29:09	2–0
	2–1	59:16 – EA – Liam McLinskey (13) (Shatsky, Guerra)
(Callahan) Dustin Manz (10) – EN – 59:24	3–1

0 min
Penalties
10 min
29
Shots
36

March 4, 2023; 1:05 PM	American International	3–4 (0–0, 2–1, 1–3)	Holy Cross	MassMutual Center; Attendance: 264

Game reference

Jarrett Fiske
Goalies
Jason Grande
Referees:
Brendan Blanchard
Andy Bethmann
Linesmen:
Shane Kanaly
Patrick Philbin

(Bennett) Casey McDonald (4) – 31:52	1–0
(Geschwind, Rickard) Nicholas Cardelli (11) – 37:01	2–0
	2–1	38:27 – Liam McLinskey (14) (Phillips, Peterson)
	2–2	42:03 – PP – Matt Guerra (7) (Peterson)
	2–3	51:49 – Matt DeBoer (3) (Young, MacNab)
	2–4	52:47 – GW – Liam McLinskey (15) (Phillips, Spence)
(Kramer, Manz) Casey McDonald (5) – EA – 57:21	3–4

10 min
Penalties
6 min
14
Shots
39

March 5, 2023; 1:05 PM	American International	3–4 (OT) (1–2, 2–1, 0–0, 0–1)	Holy Cross	MassMutual Center; Attendance: 297

Game reference

Jarrett Fiske
Goalies
Jason Grande
Referees:
Brendan Blanchard
Andy Bethmann
Linesmen:
Shane Kanaly
Patrick Philbin

	0–1	04:34 – Liam McLinskey (16) (Phillips, Peterson)
(Biro, Rylance) Matt Rickard (2) – 06:28	1–1
	1–2	15:02 – PP – Devin Phillips (6) (Shatsky, Cicero)
(Janhonen, Rickard) Blake Bennett (21) – 37:01	2–2
	2–3	32:13 – PP – Tyler Ghirardosi (8) (Guerra, Peterson)
(Biro, Kramer) Blake Bennett (22) – PP – 37:00	3–3
	3–4	78:46 – GW – Liam McLinskey (17) (Peterson)

12 min
Penalties
10 min
30
Shots
52

Holy Cross Won Series 2–1

==== (3) Sacred Heart vs. (6) Niagara ====
March 3, 2023; 7:00 PM	Sacred Heart	3–1 (0–0, 1–0, 2–1)	Niagara	Martire Family Arena; Attendance: 2,046

Game reference

Luke Lush
Goalies
Chad Veltri
Referees:
Ryan Sweeney
Ron Morello
Linesmen:
Anthony Valle
Christopher Zito

(Hutchison) Daniel Ebrahim (7) – 30:37	1–0
(Steele, Magera) Kevin Lombardi (11) – GW – 42:49	2–0
	2–1	48:24 – PP – Jay Ahearn (6) (Pineo, Ott)
(Lombardi, Magera) Ryan Steele (10) – EN – 58:20	3–1

8 min
Penalties
2 min
22
Shots
34

March 4, 2023; 7:00 PM	Sacred Heart	1–4 (1–1, 0–1, 0–2)	Niagara	Martire Family Arena; Attendance: 2,088

Game reference

Luke Lush
Goalies
Chad Veltri
Referees:
Ryan Sweeney
Ron Morello
Linesmen:
Anthony Valle
Christopher Zito

(Jaworski, Hutchison) Neil Shea (14) – 07:09	1–0
	1–1	09:05 – Shane Ott (6) (Cox, Ahearn)
	1–2	21:16 – GW – Olivier Gauthier (9) (unassisted)
	1–3	45:18 – Ryan Naumovski (8) (Stanley, Rodne)
	1–4	56:14 – EN – Casey Carreau (8) (Nilsson, Prohorenkovs)

2 min
Penalties
4 min
38
Shots
24

March 5, 2023; 7:00 PM	Sacred Heart	3–7 (1–2, 2–2, 0–3)	Niagara	Martire Family Arena; Attendance: 1,196

Game reference

Luke Lush
Goalies
Chad Veltri
Referees:
Ryan Sweeney
Ron Morello
Linesmen:
Anthony Valle
Christopher Zito

(Joughin, Hutchison) Austin Magera (8) – PP – 03:27	1–0
	1–1	17:07 – PP – Casey Carreau (9) (Cox, Naumovski)
	1–2	21:16 – Carter Randklev (9) (Pineo, Brockhoff)
(Tuck, Britt) Todd Goehring (11) – PP – 23:17	2–2
(Hutchison, Sansbury) Kevin Lombardi (12) – 23:56	3–2
	3–3	26:49 – PP – Jay Ahearn (7) (Randklev, Ruoho)
	3–4	35:11 – GW PP – Carter Randklev (13) (Ruoho, Pineo)
	3–5	42:36 – Olivier Gauthier (10) (Randklev, Carlin)
	3–6	49:42 – Ryan Naumovski (9) (Randklev)
	3–7	59:17 – EN – Shane Ott (10) (Ahearn, Brockhoff)

12 min
Penalties
12 min
32
Shots
24

Niagara Won Series 2–1

==== (4) Canisius vs. (5) Army ====
March 3, 2023; 7:00 PM	Canisius	5–2 (2–0, 1–1, 2–1)	Army	LECOM Harborcenter; Attendance: 231

Game reference

Jacob Barczewski
Goalies
Justin Evenson
Referees:
William McGoldrick III
CJ Hallman
Linesmen:
Sam Cuccinotta
Joe Sherman

(Kouznetsov) Nick Bowman (8) – 04:05	1–0
(Hernández, Pogue) Tyrell Buckley (1) – 07:28	2–0
	2–1	33:29 – PP – Joey Baez (21) (Abdelnour, Keranen)
(Loven, Urbank) Randy Hernández (7) – GW – 33:56	3–1
	3–2	42:01 – PP – Thomas Farrell (6) (Driscoll, Sacco)
(unassisted) Erik Urbank (5) – 49:09	4–2
(Erne) Hudson Lambert (2) – EN – 58:49	5–2

40 min
Penalties
2 min
27
Shots
37

March 4, 2023; 7:30 PM	Canisius	0–1 (OT) (0–0, 0–0, 0–0, 0–1)	Army	LECOM Harborcenter; Attendance: 361

Game reference
Jacob Barczewski	Goalies	Gavin Abric	Referees: William McGoldrick III; CJ Hallman; Linesmen: Sam Cuccinotta; Joe Sherman
0–1 / 66:17 – GW – Brett Abdelnour (21) (Smyth, Wilson)			Referees: William McGoldrick III; CJ Hallman; Linesmen: Sam Cuccinotta; Joe Sherman
4 min	Penalties	4 min	Referees: William McGoldrick III; CJ Hallman; Linesmen: Sam Cuccinotta; Joe Sherman
23	Shots	35	Referees: William McGoldrick III; CJ Hallman; Linesmen: Sam Cuccinotta; Joe Sherman

March 5, 2023; 5:00 PM	Canisius	3–0 (0–0, 2–0, 1–0)	Army	LECOM Harborcenter; Attendance: 216

Game reference

Jacob Barczewski
Goalies
Gavin Abric
Referees:
William McGoldrick III
CJ Hallman
Linesmen:
Sam Cuccinotta
Joe Sherman

(Mastrodonato, Kouznetsov) Ryan Miotto (15) – GW – 21:35	1–0
(Loven) Erik Urbank (6) – 39:56	2–0
(Buckley, Urbank) Stefano Bottini (4) – EN – 58:41	3–0

10 min
Penalties
8 min
36
Shots
29

Canisius Won Series 2–1

=== Semifinals ===
==== (1) RIT vs. (7) Holy Cross ====
March 10, 2023; 7:05 PM	RIT	0–1 (OT) (0–0, 0–0, 0–0, 0–1)	Holy Cross	Gene Polisseni Center; Attendance: 2,442

Game reference
Tommy Scarfone	Goalies	Jason Grande	Referees: Brendan Blanchard; William McGoldrick III; Linesmen: Shane Kanaly; Anthony Valle
0–1 / 68:01 – GW – Liam McLinskey (18) (Hale)			Referees: Brendan Blanchard; William McGoldrick III; Linesmen: Shane Kanaly; Anthony Valle
4 min	Penalties	4 min	Referees: Brendan Blanchard; William McGoldrick III; Linesmen: Shane Kanaly; Anthony Valle
40	Shots	23	Referees: Brendan Blanchard; William McGoldrick III; Linesmen: Shane Kanaly; Anthony Valle

March 12, 2023; 7:05 PM	RIT	4–3 (OT) (1–0, 2–3, 0–0, 1–0)	Holy Cross	Gene Polisseni Center; Attendance: 2,622

Game reference

Tommy Scarfone
Goalies
Jason Grande
Referees:
William McGoldrick III
CJ Hallman
Linesmen:
Sam Cuccinotta
Joe Sherman

(Hansen-Bukata, Cassaro) Cody Laskosky (13) – PP – 12:51	1–0
	1–1	29:20 – Devin Phillips (7) (Higgins)
(Kellenberger, Berry) Carter Wilkie (14) – 31:05	2–1
	2–2	35:28 – PP – Liam McLinskey (19) (Guerra, Peterson)
	2–3	35:54 – PP – Liam McLinskey (20) (Ghirardosi, Guerra)
(Mahan, Moretz) Gianfranco Cassaro (14) – 38:42	3–3
(Moretz, Hansen-Bukata) Elijah Gonsalves (7) – GW – 68:09	4–3

14 min
Penalties
14 min
41
Shots
27

March 12, 2023; 5:05 PM	RIT	1–5 (0–2, 1–1, 0–2)	Holy Cross	Gene Polisseni Center; Attendance: 1,932

Game reference

Tommy Scarfone
Goalies
Jason Grande
Referees:
William McGoldrick III
CJ Hallman
Linesmen:
Sam Cuccinotta
Joe Sherman

	0–1	17:15 – Jack Ricketts (7) (DeBoer, Oliphant)
	0–2	18:22 – GW SH – Grayson Constable (19) (Young, Higgins)
(Laskosky, Kellenberger) Grady Hobbs (7) – 29:09	1–2
	1–3	38:34 – Grayson Constable (6) (Ghirardosi)
	1–4	57:20 – EN – Alec Cicero (4) (Guerra)
	1–5	58:21 – EN – Liam McLinskey (21) (unassisted)

26 min
Penalties
8 min
26
Shots
24

Holy Cross Won Series 2–0

==== (4) Canisius vs. (6) Niagara ====
March 10, 2023; 6:05 PM	Canisius	1–2 (0–1, 1–1, 0–0)	Niagara	LECOM Harborcenter; Attendance: 546

Game reference

Jacob Barczewski
Goalies
Chad Veltri
Referees:
Chris Leavitt
CJ Hallman
Linesmen:
Brendan Lewis
Joe Sherman

	0–1	10:33 – PP – Ryan Cox (14) (Naumovski, Carlin)
(Pogue, Gravel) Randy Hernández (8) – 21:46	1–1
	1–2	22:42 – GW – Casey Carreau (10) (Prohorenkovs)

6 min
Penalties
25 min
29
Shots
36

March 11, 2023; 7:35 PM	Canisius	5–1 (2–0, 1–1, 2–0)	Niagara	LECOM Harborcenter; Attendance: 500

Game reference

Jacob Barczewski
Goalies
Chad Veltri
Referees:
Chris Leavitt
CJ Hallman
Linesmen:
Brendan Lewis
Joe Sherman

(Bottini) Brenden Datema (1) – 08:03	1–0
(Gravel, Miotto) Max Kouznetsov (5) – PP GW – 18:19	2–0
(Boguslavsky) Jackson Decker (3) – 28:09	3–0
	3–1	35:35 – Olivier Gauthier (14) (Pineo)
(Loven, DiGrande) Nick Bowman (9) – EN – 55:27	4–1
(Miotto, Mastrodonato) Max Kouznetsov (6) – EN – 56:11	5–1

12 min
Penalties
8 min
27
Shots
26

March 12, 2023; 7:05 PM	Canisius	4–2 (1–1, 1–1, 2–0)	Niagara	LECOM Harborcenter; Attendance: 457

Game reference

Jacob Barczewski
Goalies
Chad Veltri
Referees:
Chris Leavitt
CJ Hallman
Linesmen:
Brendan Lewis
Joe Sherman

	0–1	04:08 – Gļebs Prohorenkovs (12) (Nilsson, Carreau)
(Melaragni) Ryan Miotto (16) – PP – 15:16	1–1
(Mastrodonato, Melaragni) Ryan Miotto (17) – PP – 23:56	2–1
	2–2	39:09 – PP – Albin Nilsson (10) (Naumovski, Carreau)
(Hernández, Loven) J. D. Pogue (4) – GW – 44:39	3–2
(Mastrodonato, Melaragni) Simon Gravel (5) – PP – 50:33	4–2

12 min
Penalties
25 min
30
Shots
29

Canisius Won Series 2–1

=== Championship ===
==== (4) Canisius vs. (7) Holy Cross ====
March 18, 2023; 7:05 PM	Canisius	3–0 (0–0, 1–0, 2–0)	Holy Cross	LECOM Harborcenter; Attendance: 1,805

Game reference

Jacob Barczewski
Goalies
Jason Grande
Referees:
Brendan Blanchard
Ryan Sweeney
Linesmen:
Brendan Lewis
Joe Sherman

(Decker, Melaragni) Nick Bowman (10) – GW – 37:59	1–0
(unassisted) Markus Boguslavsky (4) – EN – 58:32	2–0
(Lambert) Keaton Mastrodonato (16) – EN – 58:57	3–0

2 min
Penalties
2 min
25
Shots
24

== Tournament awards ==
=== All-Tournament Team ===
- G: Jacob Barczewski* (Canisius)
- D: Jack Robilotti (Holy Cross)
- D: Jackson Decker (Canisius)
- F: Liam McLinskey (Holy Cross)
- F: Keaton Mastrodonato (Canisius)
- F: Nick Bowman (Canisius)

* Most Valuable Player(s)
