= 2022–23 Holy Cross Crusaders men's ice hockey season =

- Conference: 7th Atlantic Hockey
- Home ice: Hart Center

Rankings
- USCHO: NR
- USA Today: NR

Record
- Overall: 17–21–3
- Conference: 12–12–2
- Home: 6–8–1
- Road: 11–13–2

Coaches and captains
- Head coach: Bill Riga
- Assistant coaches: Eric Sorenson; Castan Sommer; Bobby Butler
- Captain(s): Grayson Constable; Nick Hale
- Alternate captain(s): Alex Peterson; Jack Ricketts

The 2022–23 Holy Cross Crusaders men's ice hockey season was the 57th season of play for the program, the 25th at the Division I level, and the 20th in the Atlantic Hockey conference. The Crusaders represented the College of the Holy Cross and were coached by Bill Riga, in his 2nd season.

== Season ==
Due in part to having to find a new starting goaltender, Holy Cross got off to a poor start. The Crusaders won just 2 out of their first 15 games. By the end of November, the team was one of the worst clubs in college hockey both on offense and defense. The Crusaders had scored more than 2 goals in a game on just 2 occasions, which coincidentally were their only wins to that point. Jason Grand got a third turn in goal as the team's starter and that seemed to work like a charm. Beginning with their match against New Hampshire, the Crusaders suddenly found life and won three games in a row. Their inspired play continued and the club lost just once over an 8-game stretch. On offense, Jack Ricketts began taking over as the team's primary scorer and, seemingly overnight, Holy Cross was managing to score goals as well.

Though there were some hiccups, Holy Cross posted a winning record over the second half of the season and crept up to 7th in the conference standings. The Crusaders faced American International in the quarterfinals, who had won every league championship over the previous 4 seasons. After dropping the opening game, Holy Cross was facing the end of their season when the Yellow Jackets score the first two goals of the rematch. Just before the end of the second, Liam McLinskey scored to cut the lead in half and began a run of 4 consecutive goals from the Crusaders. McLinskey notched the last of those markers which turned out to be the game-winner after AIC potted a third goal after pulling their goalie. McLinskey again opened CHC's scoring in the deciding game before AIC and the Crusader power play began to trade goals. A scoreless third period ended with the score tied 3–3 but Holy Cross was controlling the pace of the game. The Crusaders continued to press in overtime and attacked the AIC cage. Eventually McLinskey managed to stop a clearing attempt and then scored off of a rebound to quiet a nearly empty arena.

Holy Cross had made the conference semifinal for the first time since 2006 and their reward was facing the best team in the conference, RIT. In front of a much more boisterous and hostile crowd, Jason Grande had probably the best game of his career and stopped all 36 shots from the Tigers in regulation. The Crusaders, on the other hand, were limited to just 7 shots in the first two periods but began to warm up in the third. They more than doubled their shot total in the final 20 minutes but were unable to score themselves, sending the Crusaders into overtime once more. The play was a little more even in the extra session and, 8 minutes into the frame, Liam McLinskey got behind the defense and broke in alone on the RIT cage. After a deke, he slid the puck into the Tiger net for his sixth goal of the postseason and third consecutive game-winning goal.

Ordinarily, that goal would have sent Holy Cross to the title game, however, Atlantic Hockey had changed their postseason format that year and converted the semifinal round into a best-of-three series. Despite the reprieve for RIT, McLinskey gave the Crusaders a lead in the second game after scoring twice during a 5-on-3 power play. RIT was able to push Holy Cross into overtime yet again but this time the Crusaders came out on the losing end. While the series was tied, Holy Cross didn't panic and scored twice in the first period of the deciding game. RIT cut into the lead in the second but the Crusaders reestablished their 2-goal advantage before the start of the third. The defense held firm over the last 20 minutes, stifling the Tigers and preventing them from getting a second goal. When RIT pulled their goaltender, all that served to do was give the Crusaders an empty net to shoot at and they scored twice more, the last being McLinskey's 9th of the postseason, to cap a huge upset over the heavily favored Tigers.

With Holy Cross 1 win away from their first league championship in 17 years, The Crusaders ran into the only goalie in the conference as hot as Jason Grande. No matter how hard they tried, the Crusaders could not get a puck past Jacob Barczewski. Even after pulling Grand for an extra attacker, CHC was unable to score and lost the championship game 0–3.

== Departures ==
Player	Position	Nationality	Cause
Daniel Colabufo	Forward	United States	Transferred to Oswego State
Bryce Dolan	Defenseman	United States	Graduation (retired)
Erik Gordon	Goaltender	United States	Graduation (retired)
Michael Higgins	Defenseman	United States	Signed professional contract (HC ZUBR Přerov)
Jack Hillman	Defenseman	United States	Left program (retired)
Michael Kane	Forward	United States	Left program (retired)
Ryan Leibold	Forward	United States	Graduate transfer to Merrimack
Ryan Pineault	Defenseman	United States	Left program (retired)
Matt Radomsky	Goaltender	United States	Transferred to Alaska
Matt Slick	Defenseman	United States	Graduate transfer to Ferris State
Erkka Vänskä	Forward	Finland	Graduation (retired)
Anthony Vincent	Forward	United States	Graduate transfer to Long Island

== Recruiting ==
Player	Position	Nationality	Age	Notes
Jonathan Balah	Defenseman	Canada	21	Barrie, ON
Matt DeBoer	Forward	United States	20	Madison, NJ
Jason Grande	Goaltender	United States	23	West Chester, PA; transfer from Bentley
Louden Hogg	Goaltender	United States	19	Cheyenne, WY
Conner Jean	Forward	United States	25	Oakland, MI; transfer from Carleton
Liam McLinskey	Forward	United States	21	Pearl River, NY; transfer from Quinnipiac
Mack Oliphant	Defenseman	United States	19	Northbrook, IL
Devin Phillips	Forward	United States	21	Raleigh, NC
Jack Seymour	Defenseman	Canada	21	Chelsea, QC
Joe Solimine	Forward	United States	20	Middleton, MA
Charlie Spence	Defenseman	United States	20	Boston, MA

== Roster ==
As of August 4, 2022.

No.	Nat.	Player	Class	Pos	Height	Weight	DoB	Hometown	Previous team	NHL rights
1	(United States)	Louden Hogg	Freshman	G	5' 11" (1.8 m)	158 lb (72 kg)	2002-10-18	Cheyenne, Wyoming	Fargo (USHL)	—
2	(United States)	Jack Robilotti	Junior	D	6' 3" (1.91 m)	194 lb (88 kg)	2001-07-18	New York, New York	Fargo (USHL)	—
4	(United States)	Jake Higgins	Junior	D	6' 2" (1.88 m)	205 lb (93 kg)	2001-06-09	Hingham, Massachusetts	Deerfield (USHS–MA)	—
6	(Canada)	Jonathan Balah	Freshman	D	6' 0" (1.83 m)	183 lb (83 kg)	2001-08-15	Barrie, Ontario	Wellington (OJHL)	—
7	(United States)	Nick Hale (C)	Junior	D	5' 9" (1.75 m)	165 lb (75 kg)	1999-05-07	Raleigh, North Carolina	Brooks (AJHL)	—
8	(United States)	Charlie Spence	Freshman	D	6' 0" (1.83 m)	185 lb (84 kg)	2002-03-18	Medfield, Massachusetts	Boston Jr. Bruins (NCDC)	—
10	(United States)	Liam McLinskey	Sophomore	F	6' 3" (1.91 m)	165 lb (75 kg)	2001-02-20	Pearl River, New York	Quinnipiac (ECAC)	—
12	(United States)	Matt Guerra	Junior	F	5' 8" (1.73 m)	165 lb (75 kg)	1999-05-21	Orlando, Florida	Robert Morris (AHA)	—
13	(Canada)	Grayson Constable (C)	Senior	F	6' 2" (1.88 m)	201 lb (91 kg)	1998-05-05	Lethbridge, Alberta	Bonnyville (AJHL)	—
14	(Canada)	Matt Shatsky	Sophomore	D	6' 0" (1.83 m)	180 lb (82 kg)	2001-04-29	Winnipeg, Manitoba	Sherwood Park (AJHL)	—
15	(Canada)	Jack Ricketts (A)	Junior	F	6' 1" (1.85 m)	195 lb (88 kg)	1999-09-08	Oakville, Ontario	Oakville (OJHL)	—
17	(United States)	Matt DeBoer	Freshman	F	6' 0" (1.83 m)	185 lb (84 kg)	2002-09-02	Las Vegas, Nevada	Green Bay (USHL)	—
18	(Canada)	Bobby Young	Senior	F	5' 11" (1.8 m)	185 lb (84 kg)	1998-11-08	Kitchener, Ontario	Bonnyville (AJHL)	—
19	(United States)	Alex Peterson (A)	Senior	F	5' 10" (1.78 m)	172 lb (78 kg)	1998-03-27	Lansdale, Pennsylvania	Amarillo (NAHL)	—
20	(United States)	Devin Phillips	Freshman	F	5' 9" (1.75 m)	170 lb (77 kg)	2001-07-12	Raleigh, North Carolina	Brooks (AJHL)	—
21	(United States)	Alec Cicero	Junior	F	5' 10" (1.78 m)	180 lb (82 kg)	2001-03-09	Williamsville, New York	Buffalo (OJHL)	—
22	(Canada)	Lucas Thorne	Junior	F	6' 0" (1.83 m)	185 lb (84 kg)	1999-03-05	Dunnville, Ontario	Bonnyville (AJHL)	—
23	(United States)	Jackson MacNab	Senior	F	6' 4" (1.93 m)	200 lb (91 kg)	1998-07-03	Indianapolis, Indiana	Notre Dame (Big Ten)	—
24	(United States)	John Gelatt	Sophomore	F	5' 11" (1.8 m)	195 lb (88 kg)	2001-04-29	Middletown, New Jersey	Johnstown (NAHL)	—
26	(United States)	Liam Connors	Sophomore	F	5' 9" (1.75 m)	165 lb (75 kg)	2001-02-01	Westborough, Massachusetts	Connecticut (NCDC)	—
27	(United States)	Mack Oliphant	Freshman	D	6' 3" (1.91 m)	195 lb (88 kg)	2002-12-28	Northbrook, Illinois	Johnstown (NAHL)	—
28	(Canada)	Jack Seymour	Freshman	F	5' 11" (1.8 m)	160 lb (73 kg)	2001-04-06	Chelsea, Quebec	Chilliwack (BCHL)	—
29	(United States)	Conner Jean	Senior	F	5' 10" (1.78 m)	183 lb (83 kg)	1997-02-15	Oakland, Michigan	Carleton (OUA)	—
30	(United States)	Jason Grande	Junior (RS)	G	6' 3" (1.91 m)	200 lb (91 kg)	1999-02-07	West Chester, Pennsylvania	Bentley (AHA)	—
33	(Canada)	Thomas Gale	Sophomore	G	6' 1" (1.85 m)	180 lb (82 kg)	2000-06-10	Kirkland, Quebec	P. A. L. (NCDC)	—
34	(United States)	Joe Solimine	Freshman	F	5' 8" (1.73 m)	165 lb (75 kg)	2002-03-03	Middleton, Massachusetts	Boston Jr. Bruins (NCDC)	—
39	(Canada)	Tyler Ghirardosi	Junior	F	6' 3" (1.91 m)	185 lb (84 kg)	1999-10-01	Montrose, British Columbia	Quinnipiac (ECAC)	—

== Standings ==
2022–23 Atlantic Hockey Standings
	Conference record										Overall record					
	GP	W	L	T	OW	OL	SW	PTS	GF	GA	GP	W	L	T	GF	GA
RIT †	26	18	7	1	1	3	0	57	85	55	39	25	13	1	127	100
American International	26	14	8	4	2	0	3	47	87	62	39	18	14	7	124	98
Sacred Heart	26	14	9	3	2	0	2	45	87	72	37	17	17	3	107	112
Canisius *	26	13	10	3	3	1	1	41	76	71	42	20	19	3	118	119
Army	26	12	12	2	3	3	1	39	72	81	37	14	19	4	98	119
Niagara	26	10	13	3	0	3	2	38	73	86	40	19	18	3	119	129
Holy Cross	26	12	12	2	3	1	1	37	73	71	41	17	21	3	98	119
Mercyhurst	26	9	14	3	1	5	1	35	77	80	36	10	23	3	98	122
Bentley	26	8	16	2	1	1	1	27	61	89	34	11	21	2	81	124
Air Force	26	8	17	1	1	0	0	24	63	87	36	12	22	2	95	128
Championship: March 18, 2023 † indicates conference regular season champion (DeGregorio Trophy) * indicates conference tournament champion (Riley Trophy); Rankings: USCHO.com Top 20 Poll

== Schedule and results ==
Date	Time	Opponent^{#}	Rank^{#}	Site	TV	Decision	Result	Attendance	Record
Exhibition
October 1	7:30 PM	Boston College*		Hart Center • Worcester, Massachusetts (Exhibition)			W 3–2		
Regular Season
October 7	8:07 PM	at #3 North Dakota*		Ralph Engelstad Arena • Grand Forks, North Dakota	Midco	Grande	L 0–6	11,181	0–1–0
October 8	7:07 PM	at #3 North Dakota*		Ralph Engelstad Arena • Grand Forks, North Dakota	Midco	Hogg	L 1–4	11,376	0–2–0
October 13	7:00 PM	Sacred Heart		Hart Center • Worcester, Massachusetts	FloHockey	Gale	L 2–3	327	0–3–0 (0–1–0)
October 14	7:00 PM	Sacred Heart		Hart Center • Worcester, Massachusetts	FloHockey	Hogg	L 1–5	246	0–4–0 (0–2–0)
October 18	7:00 PM	at American International		MassMutual Center • Springfield, Massachusetts	FloHockey	Grande	W 7–3	254	1–4–0 (1–2–0)
October 22	7:00 PM	at Vermont*		Gutterson Fieldhouse • Burlington, Vermont	ESPN+	Grande	L 0–6	3,047	1–5–0
October 28	7:00 PM	at RIT		Gene Polisseni Center • Henrietta, New York	FloHockey	Gale	L 2–5	2,716	1–6–0 (1–3–0)
October 29	7:00 PM	at RIT		Gene Polisseni Center • Henrietta, New York	FloHockey	Gale	L 2–3 ^{OT}	1,905	1–7–0 (1–4–0)
November 4	7:00 PM	at Canisius		LECOM Harborcenter • Buffalo, New York	FloHockey	Gale	W 3–1	707	2–7–0 (2–4–0)
November 5	4:00 PM	at Canisius		LECOM Harborcenter • Buffalo, New York	FloHockey	Gale	T 2–2 ^{SOW}	919	2–7–1 (2–4–1)
November 15	7:00 PM	at American International		MassMutual Center • Springfield, Massachusetts	FloHockey	Gale	L 1–4	193	2–8–1 (2–5–1)
November 18	6:00 PM	Mercyhurst		Hart Center • Worcester, Massachusetts	FloHockey	Gale	L 1–3	517	2–9–1 (2–6–1)
November 19	2:30 PM	Mercyhurst		Hart Center • Worcester, Massachusetts	FloHockey	Gale	L 1–4	307	2–10–1 (2–7–1)
November 22	4:00 PM	at #13 Merrimack*		J. Thom Lawler Rink • North Andover, Massachusetts	ESPN+	Hogg	L 1–5	1,468	2–11–1
November 25	7:00 PM	at Brown*		Meehan Auditorium • Providence, Rhode Island	ESPN+	Gale	L 0–3	574	2–12–1
November 26	7:00 PM	New Hampshire*		Hart Center • Worcester, Massachusetts	FloHockey	Grande	W 3–2	408	3–12–1
December 2	9:00 PM	at Air Force		Cadet Ice Arena • Colorado Springs, Colorado	FloHockey	Grande	W 4–1	1,427	4–12–1 (3–7–1)
December 3	7:00 PM	at Air Force		Cadet Ice Arena • Colorado Springs, Colorado	FloHockey	Grande	W 2–1	1,493	5–12–1 (4–7–1)
December 30	7:00 PM	#2 Quinnipiac*		Hart Center • Worcester, Massachusetts	FloHockey	Grande	L 1–4	750	5–13–1
January 7	4:00 PM	Clarkson*		Hart Center • Worcester, Massachusetts	FloHockey	Grande	T 1–1 ^{OT}	379	5–13–2
January 13	7:00 PM	Air Force		Hart Center • Worcester, Massachusetts	FloHockey	Grande	W 5–2	462	6–13–2 (5–7–1)
January 15	4:00 PM	Air Force		Hart Center • Worcester, Massachusetts	FloHockey	Grande	W 4–1	321	7–13–2 (6–7–1)
January 20	7:00 PM	at Sacred Heart		Martire Family Arena • Fairfield, Connecticut	FloHockey, SNY	Gale	T 2–2 ^{SOL}	4,223	7–13–3 (6–7–2)
January 21	7:00 PM	at Sacred Heart		Martire Family Arena • Fairfield, Connecticut	FloHockey, SNY	Gale	L 1–4	4,296	7–14–3 (6–8–2)
January 27	7:00 PM	#19 RIT		Hart Center • Worcester, Massachusetts	FloHockey	Grande	L 3–4	598	7–15–3 (6–9–2)
January 28	7:00 PM	#19 RIT		Hart Center • Worcester, Massachusetts	FloHockey	Grande	W 4–3 ^{OT}	517	8–15–3 (7–9–2)
February 3	7:00 PM	at Bentley		Bentley Arena • Waltham, Massachusetts	FloHockey	Grande	W 4–1	1,678	9–15–3 (8–9–2)
February 4	4:00 PM	at Bentley		Bentley Arena • Waltham, Massachusetts	FloHockey	Gale	W 3–2 ^{OT}	1,246	10–15–3 (9–9–2)
February 10	7:00 PM	at Army		Tate Rink • West Point, New York	FloHockey	Gale	L 2–5	2,129	10–16–3 (9–10–2)
February 11	4:00 PM	at Army		Tate Rink • West Point, New York	FloHockey	Hogg	W 7–0	1,976	11–16–3 (10–10–2)
February 17	7:00 PM	Niagara		Hart Center • Worcester, Massachusetts	FloHockey	Hogg	W 4–3	475	12–16–3 (11–10–2)
February 18	7:00 PM	Niagara		Hart Center • Worcester, Massachusetts	FloHockey	Gale	W 3–0	480	13–16–3 (12–10–2)
February 24	7:00 PM	Canisius		Hart Center • Worcester, Massachusetts	FloHockey	Gale	L 0–3	576	13–17–3 (12–11–2)
February 25	7:00 PM	Canisius		Hart Center • Worcester, Massachusetts	FloHockey	Gale	L 3–6	304	13–18–3 (12–12–2)
Atlantic Hockey Tournament
March 3	1:05 pm	at American International*		MassMutual Center • Springfield, Massachusetts (Quarterfinal Game 1)	FloHockey	Grande	L 1–3	147	13–19–3
March 4	1:05 pm	at American International*		MassMutual Center • Springfield, Massachusetts (Quarterfinal Game 2)	FloHockey	Grande	W 4–3	264	14–19–3
March 5	1:05 pm	at American International*		MassMutual Center • Springfield, Massachusetts (Quarterfinal Game 3)	FloHockey	Grande	W 4–3	297	15–19–3
March 10	7:05 PM	#20 RIT*		Gene Polisseni Center • Henrietta, New York (Semifinal Game 1)	FloHockey	Grande	W 1–0 ^{OT}	2,442	16–19–3
March 11	7:05 PM	#20 RIT*		Gene Polisseni Center • Henrietta, New York (Semifinal Game 2)	FloHockey	Grande	L 3–4 ^{OT}	2,622	16–20–3
March 12	5:05 PM	#20 RIT*		Gene Polisseni Center • Henrietta, New York (Semifinal Game 3)	FloHockey	Grande	W 5–1	1,932	17–20–3
March 18	7:05 PM	at Canisius*		LECOM Harborcenter • Buffalo, New York (Championship)	FloHockey	Grande	L 0–3	1,805	17–21–3
*Non-conference game. ^{#}Rankings from USCHO.com Poll. All times are in Eastern Time. Source:

== Scoring statistics ==
Name	Position	Games	Goals	Assists	Points	PIM
Jack Ricketts	C	41	16	16	32	32
Liam McLinskey	F	40	21	4	25	22
Matt Guerra	F	41	7	16	23	28
Alex Peterson	F	38	5	14	19	37
Devin Phillips	F	38	7	11	18	22
Alec Cicero	F	40	4	14	18	30
Nick Hale	D	36	7	10	17	28
Tyler Ghirardosi	F	37	8	8	16	31
Matt Shatsky	D	41	1	13	14	29
Grayson Constable	F	40	6	6	12	12
Mack Oliphant	D	41	2	10	12	10
Lucas Thorne	C	36	5	6	11	12
Bobby Young	C	36	0	9	9	32
Matt DeBoer	W	39	3	5	8	18
Jake Higgins	D	41	1	5	6	45
Jack Robilotti	D	41	1	4	5	55
Conner Jean	C	11	1	2	3	4
Charlie Spence	D	30	1	2	3	12
John Gelatt	F	38	0	3	3	19
Joe Solimine	C	13	1	1	2	5
Jack MacNab	RW	30	0	2	2	4
Jack Seymour	RW	8	1	0	1	4
Jonathan Balah	D	17	0	1	1	2
Louden Hogg	G	7	0	1	1	0
Liam Connors	F	3	0	0	0	0
Thomas Gale	G	18	0	0	0	0
Jason Grande	G	20	0	0	0	10
Total			98	164	262	503

== Goaltending statistics ==
Name	Games	Minutes	Wins	Losses	Ties	Goals against	Saves	Shut outs	SV %	GAA
Jason Grande	20	1131:51	12	7	1	44	453	1	.911	2.33
Thomas Gale	19	990:01	3	11	2	43	397	1	.902	2.61
Louden Hogg	8	365:03	2	3	0	20	137	1	.873	3.29
Empty Net	-	30:35	-	-	-	12	-	-	-	-
Total	41	2519:22	17	21	3	119	987	3	.902	2.58

== Rankings ==
Poll	Week																											
Poll	Pre	1	2	3	4	5	6	7	8	9	10	11	12	13	14	15	16	17	18	19	20	21	22	23	24	25	26	27 (Final)
USCHO.com	NR	-	NR	NR	NR	NR	NR	NR	NR	NR	NR	NR	NR	-	NR	NR	NR	NR	NR	NR	NR	NR	NR	NR	NR	NR	-	NR
USA Today	NR	NR	NR	NR	NR	NR	NR	NR	NR	NR	NR	NR	NR	NR	NR	NR	NR	NR	NR	NR	NR	NR	NR	NR	NR	NR	NR	NR

Note: USCHO did not release a poll in weeks 1, 13, or 26.

== Awards and honors ==
Player	Award	Ref
Jack Ricketts	Atlantic Hockey Second Team	
Nick Hale	Atlantic Hockey Third Team	
Mack Oliphant	Atlantic Hockey Rookie Team	
Jack Robilotti	Atlantic Hockey All-Tournament Team	
Liam McLinskey	Atlantic Hockey All-Tournament Team	
