= 2022–23 RIT Tigers men's ice hockey season =

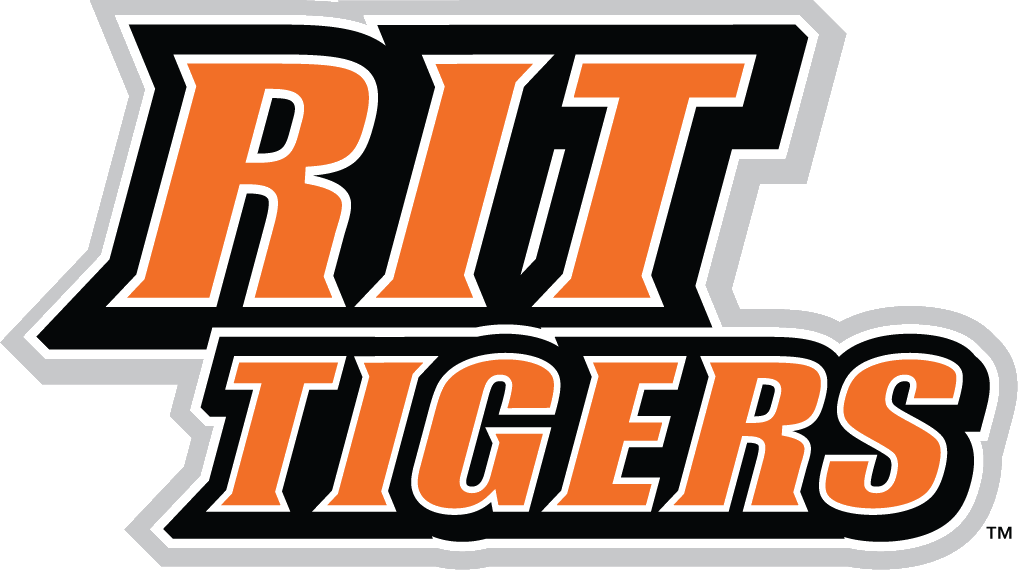

Atlantic Hockey, Champion
- Conference: 1st Atlantic Hockey
- Home ice: Gene Polisseni Center

Rankings
- USCHO: NR
- USA Today: NR

Record
- Overall: 25–13–1
- Conference: 18–7–1
- Home: 14–7–1
- Road: 10–6–0
- Neutral: 1–0–0

Coaches and captains
- Head coach: Wayne Wilson
- Assistant coaches: Brian Hills; David Insalaco; Shane Madolora
- Captain(s): Andrew Petrucci; Kobe Walker
- Alternate captain(s): Spencer Berry; Elijiah Gonsalves; Caleb Moretz

The 2022–23 RIT Tigers men's ice hockey season was the 59th season of play for the program, the 18th at the Division I level, and the 17th in the Atlantic Hockey conference. The Tigers represented the Rochester Institute of Technology and were coached by Wayne Wilson, in his 24th season.

== Season ==
RIT got off to a good start, beginning the season 10–2 and rocketing to the top of the Atlantic Hockey standings. The Tigers were riding a wave of solid goaltending from Tommy Scarfone paired with a very consistent offense that was averaging nearly 4 goals per game. Carter Wilkie had taken over as the team's primary scorer but the biggest improvement to the offense came from Gianfranco Cassaro and Aiden Hansen-Bukata on the back end. Their pairing provided immediate dividends; Hansen-Bukata eclipsed his career scoring totals by late November while Cassaro was able to accomplish the same feat in just 7 games.

By a quirk of the schedule, 10 of those early games were against conference opponents. This meant that, despite their record, RIT was still outside the top 16 in the PairWise rankings. The Tigers would have several opportunities to demonstrate that they were worthy of a potential at-large bid with the first chance coming against Princeton. While the split that they earned wasn't the worst result, the evened result didn't help their ranking. After returning from their winter break, the Tigers took on #5 Penn State. In their biggest test of the year, RIT was outgunned in the first game, getting outshot 29–47 in a 1–6 loss. While the score was a little better in the rematch, they were still outplayed for most of the game. The defeats showed that the team still had some work to do and would need to perform well in the second half of the season to guarantee themselves a spot in the NCAA tournament. The only saving grace from the Penn State losses is, because the Nittany Lions were ranked so high, RIT only fell to 23 in the rankings.

January proved to be kind to the Tigers and the team went 6–0–1 in their next seven games, including a sweep of Arizona State. the streak put the team 12 games above .500 and, more importantly, into the top 15 of the Pairwise for the first time since week 4. After the games with the Sun Devils, RIT had a very easy slate of games with all games coming against Atlantic Hockey opponents and each being in the bottom half of the standings.

In what should have been a comfortable stretch, RIT went 2–5 with a similar issue rearing its head. RIT had made a habit of taking penalties throughout the year. The team was good enough to survive without allowing too many power play goals but the amount of time they spent defending meant that the Tigers weren't a threat to score. Even when they weren't short-handed, the Tigers were taking match penalties and several key players were getting ejected. The losses didn't affect RIT's position in the standings, as they had already built a huge lead, however, it the did drop the Tigers back into the low-20s in the PairWise.

As they began their postseason run, RIT knew that it had to win the conference tournament if it was going to make an NCAA tournament appearance. Fortunately, as the top seed, they would face the lowest-seed at each stage of the tournament. Additionally, Atlantic Hockey had decided to hold all tournament games at team sites, meaning that the Tigers would play at home for the duration of their run.

After dispatching Mercyhurst in straight sets, the Tigers got a welcome surprise when7th-seeded Holy Cross was their next opponent. The Tigers were expected to make quick work of the Crusaders, however, a stellar performance from Jason Grande sent both teams into overtime without a goal between them. Liam McLinskey ended the game 8 minutes into the extra session and put the Tigers' backs to the wall. Luckily, Atlantic Hockey had changed the playoff format for that season, converting the semifinal round into a best-of-three series. The rematch started out in RIT's favor with the team taking the lead twice, however, the Tigers got into penalty trouble in the second period and suddenly found themselves behind. Cassaro ties the match with his 14th of the year and the two goalies then battled to a stalemate for the remainder of regulation, leading to a second overtime match. The winning marker took nearly the same amount of time to be generated as the first, however, this time the Tigers were on the winning side of the leger thanks to Elijah Gonsalves. With a winner-take-all game in front of them, RIT had a sluggish start and took two penalties before 5 minutes had elapsed. To make matters worse, Wilkie received a match penalty for kneeing and was removed from the game after just 10 minutes. Holy Cross netted the first marker with about three minutes remaining in the opening frame but RIT had a chance to tie with a power play to end the period. Instead of capitalizing on their opportunity, RIT could only watch as Holy Cross scored a short-handed goal and ended the period with a 2-goal advantage. The game tightened up in the second and the teams traded goals but the Tigers were never really able to get back into the match. RIT couldn't overcome the disastrous 1st period and two empty-net goals sealed their fate.

== Departures ==
Player	Position	Nationality	Cause
Ian Andriano	Goaltender	Canada	Graduation (retired)
Nick Bruce	Forward	Canada	Graduation (retired)
Will Calverley	Forward	Canada	Graduate transfer to Merrimack
Diarmad DiMurro	Defenseman	United States	Transferred to Geneseo State
Jake Hamacher	Forward	United States	Graduation (signed with Jacksonville Icemen)
Jake Joffe	Forward	Canada	Graduation (retired)
Merritt Oszytko	Forward	Canada	Graduation (retired)
Andrew Rinaldi	Forward	United States	Left program (retired)
Dan Willett	Forward	Canada	Graduation (signed with South Carolina Stingrays)

== Recruiting ==
Player	Position	Nationality	Age	Notes
Gustav Blom	Defenseman	Sweden	21	Stockholm, SWE
Simon Isabelle	Defenseman	Canada	21	Whitehorse, YT
Philippe Jacques	Forward	Canada	19	Quebec City, QC
Adam Jeffery	Forward	Canada	21	Leamington, ON
Matthew Kellenberger	Defenseman	Canada	23	Toronto, ON; graduate transfer from Princeton
Xavier Lapointe	Defenseman	Canada	20	Quebec City, QC
Tyler Mahan	Forward	Canada	20	Calgary, AB

== Roster ==
As of July 18, 2022.

No.	Nat.	Player	Class	Pos	Height	Weight	DoB	Hometown	Previous team	NHL rights
3	(Canada)	Spencer Berry (A)	Senior	D	6' 1" (1.85 m)	180 lb (82 kg)	1998-09-26	White Rock, British Columbia	Langley Rivermen (BCHL)	—
4	(Canada)	Dimitri Mikrogiannakis	Junior	D	6' 1" (1.85 m)	196 lb (89 kg)	1999-09-20	Aurora, Ontario	Cowichan Valley Capitals (BCHL)	—
5	(Sweden)	Gustav Blom	Freshman	F	6' 1" (1.85 m)	185 lb (84 kg)	2001-01-30	Stockholm, Sweden	New Mexico Ice Wolves (USHL)	—
6	(United States)	Calvon Boots	Senior	D	5' 10" (1.78 m)	180 lb (82 kg)	1998-02-11	Fairbanks, Alaska	American International (AHA)	—
7	(Canada)	Tanner Andrew	Sophomore	F	5' 9" (1.75 m)	170 lb (77 kg)	2000-02-11	Virden, Manitoba	Chilliwack Chiefs (BCHL)	—
8	(Canada)	Evan Miller	Sophomore	F	5' 11" (1.8 m)	175 lb (79 kg)	2000-03-07	Niagara-on-the-Lake, Ontario	Wellington Dukes (OJHL)	—
9	(Canada)	Colton Trumbla	Senior	F	6' 1" (1.85 m)	202 lb (92 kg)	1998-11-30	Winnipeg, Manitoba	St. Michael's Buzzers (OJHL)	—
10	(Canada)	Gianfranco Cassaro	Senior	D	5' 11" (1.8 m)	186 lb (84 kg)	1999-03-30	Nobleton, Ontario	Massachusetts (HEA)	—
11	(Canada)	Philippe Jacques	Freshman	F	6' 4" (1.93 m)	200 lb (91 kg)	2002-10-29	Quebec City, Quebec	Ottawa Jr. Senators (CCHL)	—
12	(Canada)	Simon Isabelle	Freshman	F	5' 10" (1.78 m)	170 lb (77 kg)	2001-01-12	Whitehorse, Yukon	Ottawa Jr. Senators (CCHL)	—
14	(Canada)	Tyler Mahan	Freshman	F	6' 0" (1.83 m)	190 lb (86 kg)	2001-12-14	Calgary, Alberta	Whitecourt Wolverines (AJHL)	—
15	(Canada)	Adam Jeffery	Freshman	F	6' 5" (1.96 m)	200 lb (91 kg)	2001-05-08	Leamington, Ontario	Leamington Flyers (GOJHL)	—
16	(Canada)	Elijah Gonsalves (A)	Senior	F	5' 9" (1.75 m)	175 lb (79 kg)	2000-03-08	Scarborough, Ontario	Wellington Dukes (OJHL)	—
18	(Canada)	Kobe Walker (C)	Senior	F	5' 9" (1.75 m)	175 lb (79 kg)	1998-04-03	Lloydminster, Alberta	Lloydminster Bobcats (AJHL)	—
19	(Canada)	Matt Kellenberger	Graduate	D	6' 1" (1.85 m)	185 lb (84 kg)	1999-01-11	Toronto, Ontario	Princeton (ECAC)	—
20	(United States)	Caleb Moretz (A)	Senior	F	5' 10" (1.78 m)	180 lb (82 kg)	1998-07-14	Fairbanks, Alaska	Flin Flon Bombers (SJHL)	—
21	(Canada)	Carter Wilkie	Sophomore	F	6' 1" (1.85 m)	190 lb (86 kg)	2000-04-03	Calgary, Alberta	West Kelowna Warriors (BCHL)	—
22	(Canada)	Grady Hobbs	Sophomore	F	5' 8" (1.73 m)	177 lb (80 kg)	2000-03-18	Deloraine, Manitoba	Dauphin Kings (MJHL)	—
23	(Canada)	Aiden Hansen-Bukata	Junior	D	6' 0" (1.83 m)	179 lb (81 kg)	1999-06-29	Delta, British Columbia	Nanaimo Clippers (BCHL)	—
24	(Canada)	Ryan Nicholson	Senior	D	6' 3" (1.91 m)	196 lb (89 kg)	1999-01-13	Mississauga, Ontario	Oakville Blades (OJHL)	—
25	(Canada)	Doug Scott	Sophomore	D	5' 10" (1.78 m)	190 lb (86 kg)	2000-04-16	North Vancouver, British Columbia	Humboldt (SJHL)	—
26	(Canada)	Cody Laskosky	Junior	F	5' 11" (1.8 m)	180 lb (82 kg)	1999-06-21	New Norway, Alberta	Camrose Kodiaks (AJHL)	—
27	(Canada)	Andrew Petrucci (C)	Senior	F	6' 1" (1.85 m)	201 lb (91 kg)	1997-05-21	Toronto, Ontario	Toronto Patriots (OJHL)	—
28	(Canada)	Xavier Lapointe	Freshman	D	6' 0" (1.83 m)	190 lb (86 kg)	2002-01-26	Quebec City, Quebec	Flin Flon Bombers (SJHL)	—
30	(Canada)	Tommy Scarfone	Sophomore	G	6' 0" (1.83 m)	170 lb (77 kg)	2000-11-19	Montreal, Quebec	Surrey Eagles (BCHL)	—
32	(Canada)	Daniel Chenard	Junior	G	6' 0" (1.83 m)	1768 lb (802 kg)	1999-10-03	Waterloo, Ontario	Wenatchee Wild (BCHL)	—
40	(Canada)	Kolby Matthews	Senior	G	6' 1" (1.85 m)	170 lb (77 kg)	1999-03-04	Coquitlam, British Columbia	Coquitlam Express (BCHL)	—

== Standings ==
2022–23 Atlantic Hockey Standings
	Conference record										Overall record					
	GP	W	L	T	OW	OL	SW	PTS	GF	GA	GP	W	L	T	GF	GA
RIT †	26	18	7	1	1	3	0	57	85	55	39	25	13	1	127	100
American International	26	14	8	4	2	0	3	47	87	62	39	18	14	7	124	98
Sacred Heart	26	14	9	3	2	0	2	45	87	72	37	17	17	3	107	112
Canisius *	26	13	10	3	3	1	1	41	76	71	42	20	19	3	118	119
Army	26	12	12	2	3	3	1	39	72	81	37	14	19	4	98	119
Niagara	26	10	13	3	0	3	2	38	73	86	40	19	18	3	119	129
Holy Cross	26	12	12	2	3	1	1	37	73	71	41	17	21	3	98	119
Mercyhurst	26	9	14	3	1	5	1	35	77	80	36	10	23	3	98	122
Bentley	26	8	16	2	1	1	1	27	61	89	34	11	21	2	81	124
Air Force	26	8	17	1	1	0	0	24	63	87	36	12	22	2	95	128
Championship: March 18, 2023 † indicates conference regular season champion (DeGregorio Trophy) * indicates conference tournament champion (Riley Trophy); Rankings: USCHO.com Top 20 Poll

== Schedule and results ==
Date	Time	Opponent^{#}	Rank^{#}	Site	TV	Decision	Result	Attendance	Record
Regular Season
October 1	7:00 PM	at Union*		Achilles Rink • Schenectady, New York	ESPN+	Scarfone	L 3–4	2,401	0–1–0
October 7	7:05 PM	Army		Gene Polisseni Center • Henrietta, New York	FloHockey	Scarfone	W 3–2	2,325	1–1–0 (1–0–0)
October 8	5:05 PM	Army		Gene Polisseni Center • Henrietta, New York	FloHockey	Matthews	W 4–1	1,760	2–1–0 (2–0–0)
October 15	7:05 PM	vs. Union*		Blue Cross Arena • Rochester, New York	FloHockey	Scarfone	W 8–5	8,766	3–1–0
October 20	9:05 PM	at Air Force		Cadet Ice Arena • Colorado Springs, Colorado	Altitude	Matthews	L 2–3	1,385	3–2–0 (2–1–0)
October 21	9:05 PM	at Air Force		Cadet Ice Arena • Colorado Springs, Colorado	FloHockey	Scarfone	W 4–2	1,591	4–2–0 (3–1–0)
October 28	7:05 PM	Holy Cross		Gene Polisseni Center • Henrietta, New York	FloHockey	Scarfone	W 5–2	2,716	5–2–0 (4–1–0)
October 29	4:05 PM	Holy Cross		Gene Polisseni Center • Henrietta, New York	FloHockey	Scarfone	W 3–2 ^{OT}	1,905	6–2–0 (5–1–0)
November 5	1:05 PM	at American International		MassMutual Center • Springfield, Massachusetts	FloHockey	Scarfone	W 4–3	227	7–2–0 (6–1–0)
November 6	3:05 PM	at American International		MassMutual Center • Springfield, Massachusetts	FloHockey	Scarfone	W 3–2	231	8–2–0 (7–1–0)
November 11	7:05 PM	Sacred Heart		Gene Polisseni Center • Henrietta, New York	FloHockey	Scarfone	W 3–1	2,394	9–2–0 (8–1–0)
November 12	5:05 PM	Sacred Heart		Gene Polisseni Center • Henrietta, New York	FloHockey	Scarfone	W 3–1	2,508	10–2–0 (9–1–0)
November 19	7:05 PM	USNTDP*		Gene Polisseni Center • Henrietta, New York (Exhibition)	FloHockey	Chenard	L 1–4	2,132	
November 25	7:05 PM	Princeton*	#20	Gene Polisseni Center • Henrietta, New York	FloHockey	Scarfone	W 5–3	1,626	11–2–0
November 26	5:05 PM	Princeton*	#20	Gene Polisseni Center • Henrietta, New York	FloHockey	Matthews	L 0–5	1,571	11–3–0
December 2	7:05 PM	Canisius		Gene Polisseni Center • Henrietta, New York	FloHockey	Scarfone	L 1–2 ^{OT}	2,628	11–4–0 (9–2–0)
December 3	7:05 PM	at Canisius		LECOM Harborcenter • Buffalo, New York	FloHockey	Scarfone	W 10–4	755	12–4–0 (10–2–0)
December 30	5:05 PM	#5 Penn State*	#20	Gene Polisseni Center • Henrietta, New York	FloHockey	Scarfone	L 1–6	3,704	12–5–0
December 31	5:30 PM	at #5 Penn State*	#20	Pegula Ice Arena • University Park, Pennsylvania		Scarfone	L 1–3	5,943	12–6–0
January 6	7:05 PM	at Bentley		Bentley Arena • Waltham, Massachusetts	FloHockey	Scarfone	W 3–0	1,483	13–6–0 (11–2–0)
January 7	4:05 PM	at Bentley		Bentley Arena • Waltham, Massachusetts	FloHockey	Scarfone	W 3–1	1,555	14–6–0 (12–2–0)
January 13	7:05 PM	Mercyhurst		Gene Polisseni Center • Henrietta, New York	FloHockey	Scarfone	T 4–4 ^{SOL}	2,060	14–6–1 (12–2–1)
January 14	5:05 PM	Mercyhurst		Gene Polisseni Center • Henrietta, New York	FloHockey	Scarfone	W 1–0	3,181	15–6–1 (13–2–1)
January 20	9:05 PM	at Arizona State*	#20	Mullett Arena • Tempe, Arizona		Scarfone	W 5–1	4,610	16–6–1
January 21	9:05 PM	at Arizona State*	#20	Mullett Arena • Tempe, Arizona		Matthews	W 5–3	4,520	17–6–1
January 27	7:05 PM	at Holy Cross	#19	Hart Center • Worcester, Massachusetts	FloHockey	Scarfone	W 4–3	598	18–6–1 (14–2–1)
January 28	7:05 PM	at Holy Cross	#19	Hart Center • Worcester, Massachusetts	FloHockey	Scarfone	L 3–4	517	18–7–1 (14–3–1)
February 3	7:05 PM	at Canisius	#18	LECOM Harborcenter • Buffalo, New York	FloHockey	Scarfone	W 3–2	785	19–7–1 (15–3–1)
February 4	7:05 PM	Canisius	#18	Gene Polisseni Center • Henrietta, New York	FloHockey	Scarfone	L 2–3 ^{OT}	3,252	19–8–1 (15–4–1)
February 10	7:05 PM	at Niagara	#18	Dwyer Arena • Lewiston, New York	FloHockey	Scarfone	L 3–4	533	19–9–1 (15–5–1)
February 11	7:05 PM	at Niagara	#18	Dwyer Arena • Lewiston, New York	FloHockey	Scarfone	L 1–4	909	19–10–1 (15–6–1)
February 17	7:05 PM	Bentley		Gene Polisseni Center • Henrietta, New York	FloHockey	Scarfone	W 4–0	2,030	20–10–1 (16–6–1)
February 18	5:05 PM	Bentley		Gene Polisseni Center • Henrietta, New York	FloHockey	Scarfone	L 1–2	2,997	20–11–1 (16–7–1)
February 24	7:05 PM	Air Force		Gene Polisseni Center • Henrietta, New York	FloHockey	Scarfone	W 3–1	2,835	21–11–1 (17–7–1)
February 25	5:05 PM	Air Force		Gene Polisseni Center • Henrietta, New York	FloHockey	Matthews	W 5–2	2,890	22–11–1 (18–7–1)
Atlantic Hockey Tournament
March 3	7:05 PM	Mercyhurst*		Gene Polisseni Center • Henrietta, New York (Quarterfinal Game 1)	FloHockey	Scarfone	W 5–3	2,259	23–11–1
March 4	7:05 PM	Mercyhurst*		Gene Polisseni Center • Henrietta, New York (Quarterfinal Game 2)	FloHockey	Scarfone	W 4–3 ^{OT}	2,901	24–11–1
March 10	7:05 PM	Holy Cross*	#20	Gene Polisseni Center • Henrietta, New York (Semifinal Game 1)	FloHockey	Scarfone	L 0–1 ^{OT}	2,442	24–12–1
March 11	7:05 PM	Holy Cross*	#20	Gene Polisseni Center • Henrietta, New York (Semifinal Game 2)	FloHockey	Scarfone	W 4–3 ^{OT}	2,622	25–12–1
March 12	5:05 PM	Holy Cross*	#20	Gene Polisseni Center • Henrietta, New York (Semifinal Game 3)	FloHockey	Scarfone	L 1–5	1,932	25–13–1
*Non-conference game. ^{#}Rankings from USCHO.com Poll. All times are in Eastern Time. Source:

== Scoring Statistics ==
Name	Position	Games	Goals	Assists	Points	PIM
Carter Wilkie	RW	39	14	26	40	78
Gianfranco Cassaro	D	39	14	18	32	42
Aiden Hansen-Bukata	D	37	2	30	32	24
Cody Laskosky	F	37	13	15	28	83
Kobe Walker	F	21	12	11	23	6
Tyler Mahan	LW	39	11	9	20	16
Caleb Moretz	C/RW	31	5	14	19	14
Tanner Andrew	C	38	10	8	18	39
Elijah Gonsalves	C/RW	39	7	11	18	55
Grady Hobbs	LW/RW	34	9	6	15	30
Simon Isabelle	RW	34	6	6	12	28
Dimitri Mikrogiannakis	D	28	4	6	10	30
Matt Kellenberger	D	78	3	6	9	33
Ryan Nicholson	D	37	2	7	9	32
Andrew Petrucci	C	39	3	5	8	33
Spencer Berry	D	37	1	6	7	25
Calvon Boots	D	28	5	1	6	37
Evan Miller	C	25	1	5	6	21
Xavier Lapointe	C	28	1	2	3	19
Adam Jeffery	LW	16	2	0	2	15
Philippe Jacques	D	22	1	1	2	12
Colton Trumbla	LW	14	1	0	1	0
Kolby Matthews	G	5	0	0	0	0
Doug Scott	D	8	0	0	0	2
Gustav Blom	D	22	0	0	0	2
Tommy Scarfone	G	34	0	0	0	2
Total			127	193	320	678

== Goaltending statistics ==
Name	Games	Minutes	Wins	Losses	Ties	Goals against	Saves	Shut outs	SV %	GAA
Tommy Scarfone	34	2066:17	22	11	1	83	934	3	.918	2.41
Kolby Matthews	6	297:58	3	2	0	14	133	0	.905	2.82
Empty Net	-	12:12	-	-	-	3	-	-	-	-
Total	39	2376:27	25	13	1	100	1067	3	.917	2.52

== Rankings ==
Poll	Week																											
Poll	Pre	1	2	3	4	5	6	7	8	9	10	11	12	13	14	15	16	17	18	19	20	21	22	23	24	25	26	27 (Final)
USCHO.com	NR	-	NR	NR	NR	NR	NR	NR	20	NR	20	20	20	-	NR	NR	20	19	18	18	NR	NR	NR	20	NR	NR	-	NR
USA Today	NR	NR	NR	NR	NR	NR	NR	NR	NR	NR	NR	NR	NR	20	NR	NR	19	18	NR	18	NR	NR	NR	NR	NR	NR	NR	NR

Note: USCHO did not release a poll in weeks 1, 13, or 26.

== Awards and honors ==
Player	Award	Ref
Carter Wilkie	Atlantic Hockey Player of the Year	
Cody Laskosky	Atlantic Hockey Best Defensive Forward	
Aiden Hansen-Bukata	Atlantic Hockey Best Defenseman	
Wayne Wilson	Atlantic Hockey Coach of the Year	
Tommy Scarfone	Atlantic Hockey First Team	
Gianfranco Cassaro	Atlantic Hockey First Team	
Aiden Hansen-Bukata	Atlantic Hockey First Team	
Carter Wilkie	Atlantic Hockey First Team	
