= 2022–23 Army Black Knights men's ice hockey season =

- Conference: 5th Atlantic Hockey
- Home ice: Tate Rink

Rankings
- USCHO: NR
- USA Today: NR

Record
- Overall: 14–19–4
- Conference: 12–12–2
- Home: 8–9–2
- Road: 6–10–2

Coaches and captains
- Head coach: Brian Riley
- Assistant coaches: Zach McKelvie; Arlen Marshall
- Captain(s): Thomas Farrell; Anthony Firriolo
- Alternate captain(s): John Keranen; Noah Wilson

The 2022–23 Army Black Knights men's ice hockey season was the 120th season of play for the program, the 113th at the Division I level, and the 20th in the Atlantic Hockey conference. The Black Knights represented the United States Military Academy and were coached by Brian Riley, in his 19th season.

== Season ==
The start to Army's season could hardly have been worse. While the offense was still trying to cope with the loss of star forward Colin Bilek, the defense collapsed and allowed a barrage of shots to reach Gavin Abric. The worst came when the Black Knights were swept by Lindenwood, a first-year program, at home and dropped to the bottom of the national rankings. The team had a week off after that debacle but seemed to have figured out a few things upon return. The most obvious change was the implementation of a goal-tending rotation between Abric and senior, Justin Evanson. That tactic paid instant dividends as the team allowed just 5 goals over a 5-game span and didn't lose a single match. The offense too began to improve and Joey Baez began taking over as the team's primary scorer.

By the midpoint of the season, the Black Knights were still recovering from their early-season woes but the team appeared to be on the right track. Army slowly moved up the Atlantic Hockey standings and had put themselves into a position for a potential home game in the playoffs. Unfortunately, the defense began playing inconsistently at the end of the season. Army split its final three weekend series and finished just 2 points behind Canisius for the final home site. Because of that, the team had to travel up to Buffalo, New York and the instability on the back end followed the Knights. After a poor performance in the first game, Army rebounded with an overtime shutout victory to push the series to a deciding third game. The offense was completely absent in the final game of the season and Army was sent packing with a 0–3 loss.

== Departures ==
Player	Position	Nationality	Cause
Colin Bilek	Forward	United States	Graduation (signed with Manitoba Moose)
Eric Butte	Forward	United States	Graduation (signed with Kansas City Mavericks)
Daniel Haider	Forward	United States	Graduation (retired)
Christopher Konin	Forward	United States	Left program (retired)
Mitch Machlitt	Forward	United States	Transferred to Geneseo State
Coby Mack	Defenseman	United States	Graduation (retired)
Brody Medeiros	Defenseman	United States	Left program (retired)
Andrew Quetell	Defenseman	United States	Graduation (retired)
Brad Zona	Defenseman	United States	Left program (retired)

== Recruiting ==
Player	Position	Nationality	Age	Notes
Jude Brower	Defenseman	United States	21	Mahopac, NY
Joey Dosan	Forward	United States	21	Bloomington, MN
John Driscoll	Defenseman	United States	21	Eagle, ID
Reese Farrell	Forward	United States	21	Auburn, ME
Max Itagaki	Forward	United States	20	Glenview, IL
Lucas Kanta	Forward	United States	21	Grand Forks, ND
Owen Nolan	Defenseman	United States	22	Mahopac, NY
Trevor Smith	Forward	United States	21	Raleigh, NC
Sean Vlasich	Defenseman	United States	21	Upper Saddle River, NJ
Stephen Willey	Forward	United States	21	Shelton, CT

== Roster ==
As of August 16, 2022.

No.	Nat.	Player	Class	Pos	Height	Weight	DoB	Hometown	Previous team	NHL rights
1	(United States)	Gavin Abric	Junior	G	6' 3" (1.91 m)	185 lb (84 kg)	2001-01-11	Hayward, Wisconsin	Jersey Hitmen (NCDC)	—
2	(United States)	Thomas Farrell (C)	Senior	D	6' 1" (1.85 m)	200 lb (91 kg)	1999-01-18	Mettawa, Illinois	Youngstown Phantoms (USHL)	—
3	(United States)	Kendrick Frost	Senior	F	6' 4" (1.93 m)	200 lb (91 kg)	1999-04-01	Lee's Summit, Missouri	Brookings Blizzard (NAHL)	—
4	(United States)	John Driscoll	Freshman	D	6' 4" (1.93 m)	205 lb (93 kg)	2001-08-19	Littleton, Colorado	Green Bay Gamblers (USHL)	—
7	(United States)	Andrew Gilbert	Sophomore	D	6' 5" (1.96 m)	210 lb (95 kg)	2000-05-02	Fairfield, Connecticut	Jersey Hitmen (NCDC)	—
8	(United States)	Ricky Lyle	Junior	F	6' 1" (1.85 m)	190 lb (86 kg)	2000-08-21	Duluth, Minnesota	Madison Capitols (USHL)	—
9	(United States)	Reese Farrell	Freshman	F	5' 11" (1.8 m)	205 lb (93 kg)	2001-02-21	Auburn, Maine	Maine (NAHL)	—
10	(United States)	Jake Felker	Junior	F	5' 11" (1.8 m)	190 lb (86 kg)	2000-03-19	Omaha, Nebraska	Youngstown Phantoms (USHL)	—
11	(United States)	Josh Bohlin	Sophomore	F	6' 1" (1.85 m)	190 lb (86 kg)	2000-02-10	Wausau, Wisconsin	Minnesota Wilderness (NAHL)	—
12	(United States)	John Keranen (A)	Senior	F	6' 2" (1.88 m)	195 lb (88 kg)	1998-08-31	Delano, Minnesota	Minnesota Magicians (NAHL)	—
13	(United States)	Michael Sacco	Sophomore	F	5' 8" (1.73 m)	175 lb (79 kg)	1999-11-16	Syosset, New York	Wilkes-Barre/Scranton Knights (NAHL)	—
14	(United States)	Owen Nolan	Freshman	D	6' 0" (1.83 m)	185 lb (84 kg)	2000-03-10	Mahopac, New York	Lone Star Brahmas (NAHL)	—
15	(United States)	Lucas Kanta	Freshman	F	6' 2" (1.88 m)	195 lb (88 kg)	2001-04-20	Grand Forks, North Dakota	Minnesota Magicians (NAHL)	—
14	(United States)	Hunter McCoy	Sophomore	F	6' 0" (1.83 m)	195 lb (88 kg)	2000-08-01	Newburyport, Massachusetts	Maryland Black Bears (NAHL)	—
17	(United States)	Anthony Firriolo (C)	Senior	D	5' 11" (1.8 m)	165 lb (75 kg)	1998-07-03	Montville, New Jersey	Corpus Christi IceRays (NAHL)	—
18	(United States)	Max Itagaki	Freshman	F	5' 5" (1.65 m)	155 lb (70 kg)	2002-06-18	Glenview, Illinois	Nanaimo Clippers (BCHL)	—
19	(United States)	Brett Abdelnour	Senior	F	5' 9" (1.75 m)	170 lb (77 kg)	1998-10-23	Macomb, Michigan	Amarillo Bulls (NAHL)	—
20	(United States)	Sean Vlasich	Freshman	D	5' 9" (1.75 m)	175 lb (79 kg)	2001-04-20	Hillsdale, New Jersey	North Iowa Bulls (NAHL)	—
21	(United States)	Stephen Willey	Freshman	F	6' 1" (1.85 m)	195 lb (88 kg)	2001-03-26	Shelton, Connecticut	New Jersey Titans (NAHL)	—
22	(United States)	Noah Wilson (A)	Senior	D	6' 0" (1.83 m)	195 lb (88 kg)	1998-12-21	Fond du Lac, Wisconsin	Fairbanks Ice Dogs (NAHL)	—
23	(United States)	Joey Baez	Sophomore	F	5' 9" (1.75 m)	175 lb (79 kg)	2000-01-12	Tampa, Florida	Lone Star Brahmas (NAHL)	—
24	(United States)	Andrew Garby	Sophomore	D	5' 9" (1.75 m)	160 lb (73 kg)	2000-09-17	Canton, Michigan	Fairbanks Ice Dogs (NAHL)	—
25	(United States)	Patrick Smyth	Senior	F	6' 4" (1.93 m)	215 lb (98 kg)	1999-04-23	Toledo, Ohio	Dubuque Fighting Saints (USHL)	—
26	(United States)	Joey Dosan	Freshman	D	6' 6" (1.98 m)	220 lb (100 kg)	2001-03-20	Bloomington, Minnesota	Springfield Jr. Blues (NAHL)	—
27	(United States)	Trevor Smith	Freshman	F	5' 9" (1.75 m)	185 lb (84 kg)	2001-03-02	Raleigh, North Carolina	Boston Advantage (NCDC)	—
28	(United States)	Jude Brower	Freshman	D	6' 1" (1.85 m)	180 lb (82 kg)	2001-06-11	Mahopac, New York	Boston Junior Bruins (NCDC)	—
29	(United States)	Eric Huss	Junior	F	5' 10" (1.78 m)	175 lb (79 kg)	1999-03-16	Dallas, Texas	Lone Star Brahmas (NAHL)	—
31	(United States)	Evan Szary	Sophomore	G	5' 11" (1.8 m)	175 lb (79 kg)	2000-02-29	Nashville, Tennessee	South Shore Kings (NCDC)	—
34	(United States)	Justin Evenson	Senior	G	6' 1" (1.85 m)	175 lb (79 kg)	1999-08-20	Minnetonka, Minnesota	Amarillo Bulls (NAHL)	—

== Standings ==
2022–23 Atlantic Hockey Standings
	Conference record										Overall record					
	GP	W	L	T	OW	OL	SW	PTS	GF	GA	GP	W	L	T	GF	GA
RIT †	26	18	7	1	1	3	0	57	85	55	39	25	13	1	127	100
American International	26	14	8	4	2	0	3	47	87	62	39	18	14	7	124	98
Sacred Heart	26	14	9	3	2	0	2	45	87	72	37	17	17	3	107	112
Canisius *	26	13	10	3	3	1	1	41	76	71	42	20	19	3	118	119
Army	26	12	12	2	3	3	1	39	72	81	37	14	19	4	98	119
Niagara	26	10	13	3	0	3	2	38	73	86	40	19	18	3	119	129
Holy Cross	26	12	12	2	3	1	1	37	73	71	41	17	21	3	98	119
Mercyhurst	26	9	14	3	1	5	1	35	77	80	36	10	23	3	98	122
Bentley	26	8	16	2	1	1	1	27	61	89	34	11	21	2	81	124
Air Force	26	8	17	1	1	0	0	24	63	87	36	12	22	2	95	128
Championship: March 18, 2023 † indicates conference regular season champion (DeGregorio Trophy) * indicates conference tournament champion (Riley Trophy); Rankings: USCHO.com Top 20 Poll

== Schedule and results ==
Date	Time	Opponent^{#}	Rank^{#}	Site	TV	Decision	Result	Attendance	Record
Regular Season
October 2	4:00 PM	Union*		Tate Rink • West Point, New York	FloHockey	Abric	T 2–2 ^{OT}	1,463	0–0–1
October 7	7:00 PM	at RIT		Gene Polisseni Center • Henrietta, New York	FloHockey	Abric	L 2–3	2,325	0–1–1 (0–1–0)
October 8	5:00 PM	at RIT		Gene Polisseni Center • Henrietta, New York	FloHockey	Abric	L 1–4	1,760	0–2–1 (0–2–0)
October 15	7:00 PM	at Rensselaer*		Houston Field House • Troy, New York	ESPN+	Abric	L 4–7	2,085	0–3–1
October 21	7:00 PM	at New Hampshire*		Whittemore Center • Durham, New Hampshire	ESPN+	Abric	L 1–3	5,608	0–4–1
October 23	2:00 PM	USNTDP*		Tate Rink • West Point, New York (Exhibition)		Evenson	L 6–7 ^{OT}	1,948	
October 28	7:00 PM	American International		Tate Rink • West Point, New York	FloHockey	Abric	L 2–8	1,492	0–5–1 (0–3–0)
October 30	2:00 PM	Dartmouth*		Tate Rink • West Point, New York	FloHockey	Abric	W 8–3	1,230	1–5–1
November 4	7:00 PM	Lindenwood*		Tate Rink • West Point, New York	FloHockey	Abric	L 1–2	1,133	1–6–1
November 5	4:00 PM	Lindenwood*		Tate Rink • West Point, New York	FloHockey	Abric	L 3–5	1,214	1–7–1
November 18	7:00 PM	Bentley		Tate Rink • West Point, New York	FloHockey	Evenson	W 2–0	1,286	2–7–1 (1–3–0)
November 19	7:00 PM	Bentley		Tate Rink • West Point, New York	FloHockey	Abric	W 5–2	1,347	3–7–1 (2–3–0)
November 25	1:00 PM	at Canisius		LECOM Harborcenter • Buffalo, New York	FloHockey	Evenson	T 2–2 ^{SOL}	589	3–7–2 (2–3–1)
November 26	1:00 PM	at Canisius		LECOM Harborcenter • Buffalo, New York	FloHockey	Abric	W 3–1	627	4–7–2 (3–3–1)
December 2	7:00 PM	Niagara		Tate Rink • West Point, New York	FloHockey	Evenson	W 3–0	1,846	5–7–2 (4–3–1)
December 3	4:00 PM	Niagara		Tate Rink • West Point, New York	FloHockey	Abric	L 2–4	1,319	5–8–2 (4–4–1)
December 9	7:00 PM	at Mercyhurst		Mercyhurst Ice Center • Erie, Pennsylvania	FloHockey	Evenson	L 3–4	1,184	5–9–2 (4–5–1)
December 10	7:00 PM	at Mercyhurst		Mercyhurst Ice Center • Erie, Pennsylvania	FloHockey	Abric	W 3–2 ^{OT}	-	6–9–2 (5–5–1)
January 2	7:00 PM	at Yale*		Ingalls Rink • New Haven, Connecticut	ESPN+	Evenson	L 1–5	1,200	6–10–2
January 5	7:00 PM	at Sacred Heart		Total Mortgage Arena • Bridgeport, Connecticut	FloHockey	Abric	L 0–5	748	6–11–2 (5–6–1)
January 8	2:00 PM	#11 Providence*		Tate Rink • West Point, New York	FloHockey	Abric	T 3–3 ^{OT}	2,214	6–11–3
January 13	7:00 PM	Canisius		Tate Rink • West Point, New York	FloHockey	Abric	W 2–0	1,769	7–11–3 (6–6–1)
January 14	7:00 PM	Canisius		Tate Rink • West Point, New York	FloHockey	Abric	L 4–5	1,564	7–12–3 (6–7–1)
January 17	7:00 PM	American International		Tate Rink • West Point, New York	FloHockey	Abric	L 1–2 ^{OT}	977	7–13–3 (6–8–1)
January 27	7:00 PM	Air Force		Tate Rink • West Point, New York (Rivalry)	FloHockey	Abric	W 3–1	2,600	8–13–3 (7–8–1)
January 28	4:00 PM	Air Force		Tate Rink • West Point, New York (Rivalry)	FloHockey	Evenson	L 4–6	2,681	8–14–3 (7–9–1)
February 3	7:00 PM	at Niagara		Dwyer Arena • Lewiston, New York	FloHockey	Evenson	W 3–2 ^{OT}	678	9–14–3 (8–9–1)
February 4	5:30 PM	at Niagara		Dwyer Arena • Lewiston, New York	FloHockey	Abric	T 3–3 ^{SOW}	541	9–14–4 (8–9–2)
February 7	7:00 PM	at Sacred Heart		Martire Family Arena • Fairfield, Connecticut	FloHockey, SNY	Evenson	W 4–1	2,643	10–14–4 (9–9–2)
February 10	7:05 PM	Holy Cross		Tate Rink • West Point, New York	FloHockey	Evenson	W 5–2	2,129	11–14–4 (10–9–2)
February 11	4:00 PM	Holy Cross		Tate Rink • West Point, New York	FloHockey	Abric	L 0–7	1,976	11–15–4 (10–10–2)
February 17	7:00 PM	Mercyhurst		Tate Rink • West Point, New York	FloHockey	Evenson	W 3–2 ^{OT}	1,441	12–15–4 (11–10–2)
February 18	4:00 PM	Mercyhurst		Tate Rink • West Point, New York	FloHockey	Evenson	L 3–7	1,700	12–16–4 (11–11–2)
February 24	7:05 PM	at Bentley		Bentley Arena • Waltham, Massachusetts	FloHockey	Evenson	W 5–3	1,555	13–16–4 (12–11–2)
February 25	4:05 PM	at Bentley		Bentley Arena • Waltham, Massachusetts	FloHockey	Abric	L 4–5 ^{OT}	1,501	13–17–4 (12–12–2)
Atlantic Hockey Tournament
March 3	7:00 PM	at Canisius*		LECOM Harborcenter • Buffalo, New York (Quarterfinal Game 1)	FloHockey	Evenson	L 2–5	231	13–18–4
March 4	7:30 PM	at Canisius*		LECOM Harborcenter • Buffalo, New York (Quarterfinal Game 2)	FloHockey	Abric	W 1–0 ^{OT}	361	14–18–4
March 5	5:00 PM	at Canisius*		LECOM Harborcenter • Buffalo, New York (Quarterfinal Game 3)	FloHockey	Abric	L 0–3	216	14–19–4
*Non-conference game. ^{#}Rankings from USCHO.com Poll. All times are in Eastern Time. Source:

== Scoring statistics ==
Name	Position	Games	Goals	Assists	Points	PIM
Max Itagaki	F	37	4	29	33	28
Anthony Firriolo	D	36	5	24	29	18
Joey Baez	F	37	21	7	28	40
John Keranen	F	36	11	17	28	12
Ricky Lyle	LW	37	13	11	24	43
Brett Abdelnour	F	37	10	14	24	20
Thomas Farrell	D	37	6	14	20	18
Michael Sacco	F	34	8	8	16	30
Noah Wilson	D	37	3	9	12	39
John Driscoll	D	33	2	10	12	16
Lucas Kanta	F	33	5	3	8	16
Patrick Smyth	F	33	1	6	7	18
Jake Felker	F	37	3	2	5	8
Reese Farrell	F	16	2	2	4	2
Trevor Smith	F	27	1	2	3	8
Andrew Garby	D	34	1	1	2	16
Eric Huss	F	26	1	1	2	4
Sean Vlasich	D	32	1	1	2	4
Stephen Willey	F	6	0	1	1	0
Owen Nolan	D	8	0	1	1	2
Kendrick Frost	F	11	0	1	1	0
Justin Evenson	G	13	0	1	1	0
Hunter McCoy	F	14	0	1	1	2
Jude Brower	D	15	0	1	1	0
Evan Szary	G	2	0	0	0	0
Josh Bohlin	F	2	0	0	0	0
Joey Dosan	F	12	0	0	0	4
Gavin Abric	G	25	0	0	0	0
Andrew Gilbert	D	32	0	0	0	8
Total			98	167	265	323

== Goaltending statistics ==
Name	Games	Minutes	Wins	Losses	Ties	Goals against	Saves	Shut outs	SV %	GAA
Justin Evenson	13	769:27	7	5	1	34	347	2	.911	2.65
Gavin Abric	25	1428:36	7	14	3	77	703	2	.901	3.23
Evan Szary	2	30:40	0	0	0	3	10	0	.769	5.87
Empty Net	-	28:19	-	-	-	5	-	-	-	-
Total	37	2257:02	14	19	4	119	1060	4	.903	3.20

== Rankings ==
Poll	Week																											
Poll	Pre	1	2	3	4	5	6	7	8	9	10	11	12	13	14	15	16	17	18	19	20	21	22	23	24	25	26	27 (Final)
USCHO.com	NR	-	NR	NR	NR	NR	NR	NR	NR	NR	NR	NR	NR	-	NR	NR	NR	NR	NR	NR	NR	NR	NR	NR	NR	NR	-	NR
USA Today	NR	NR	NR	NR	NR	NR	NR	NR	NR	NR	NR	NR	NR	NR	NR	NR	NR	NR	NR	NR	NR	NR	NR	NR	NR	NR	NR	NR

Note: USCHO did not release a poll in weeks 1, 13, or 26.

== Awards and honors ==
Player	Award	Ref
Noah Wilson	Derek Hines Unsung Hero Award	
Max Itagaki	Atlantic Hockey Rookie of the Year	
Joey Baez	Atlantic Hockey Second Team	
John Keranen	Atlantic Hockey Third Team	
Max Itagaki	Atlantic Hockey Rookie Team	
