= 2022–23 Sacred Heart Pioneers men's ice hockey season =

- Conference: 3rd Atlantic Hockey
- Home ice: Total Mortgage Arena; Martire Family Arena

Rankings
- USCHO: NR
- USA Today: NR

Record
- Overall: 17–17–3
- Conference: 14–9–3
- Home: 10–9–1
- Road: 6–8–2
- Neutral: 1–0–0

Coaches and captains
- Head coach: C. J. Marottolo
- Assistant coaches: Scott McDougall; Craig Height
- Captain(s): Ryan Steele; Braeden Tuck
- Alternate captain(s): Patrick Dawson; Todd Goehring; Neil Shea

The 2022–23 Sacred Heart Pioneers men's ice hockey season was the 30th season of play for the program, the 25th at the Division I level, and the 20th in the Atlantic Hockey conference. The Pioneers represented Sacred Heart University and were coached by C. J. Marottolo, in his 14th season.

== Season ==
The biggest development for the program was the completion of the Martire Family Arena. While the new arena had significantly less seating capacity, the chief advantage was being the first on-campus home for the team. Not only would this allow greater access for the program but it would also be much easier for the student body to attend games. Because the opening for the rink wouldn't be until January 2023, the team had to play the first half of the season at the Total Mortgage Arena.

Perhaps in anticipation of their new venue, Sacred Heart began the season well. While incumbent starter Justin Robbins began the season in goal, he was soon replaced by Luke Lush. With stable goaltending, the offense kicked into gear and pushed the Pioneers to a 6–2–1 record by early November. The hot start not only had the team at the top of the conference standings but also had them above the water line for an NCAA tournament berth (a rare thing for Atlantic Hockey). In mid-November, Sacred Heart had a showdown with the other conference leader, RIT. Unfortunately, at that exact moment the Pioneers' offense dried up and the team scored just 4 goals over their next 5 games. When they finally ended their slump, Sacred Heart had slid into the middle of the standings and was in the bottom half of the national rankings. Even by winning their next five games, including a surprising upset of Northeastern, Sacred Heart remained well away from an at-large bid and would likely have to win their conference tournament if it were to make the NCAA tournament.

After the winter break, with construction on schedule, Sacred Heart christened its new building by hosting #20 Boston College. With more than 4,000 in attendance, Sacred Heart lost the match but were still able to push the Eagles into overtime. Figures remained strong in the new building and the Pioneers saw at least 4,000 people in 6 of their final 7 home games. Unfortunately for the Pioneers, while the building was mostly full the product on the ice was a little more inconsistent. Sacred Heart ended up going 3–5–1 in the last month of the season, including losing the season series to American International, and ended up 3rd in the conference.

The Pioneers began the postseason with a win over Niagara, however, everything went sour afterwards. After opening the scoring in the second game, Sacred Heart went the final 53 minutes without a goal and lost 1–4 despite firing 38 shots on goal. The offense was a bit better in the rubber match but the penalty kill imploded. The Purple Eagles scored three power play goals, the final being the eventual game-winner, and ran the Pioneers out of their own building. It was a disappointing end to what had once been a successful season.

== Departures ==
Player	Position	Nationality	Cause
Alex Bates	Defenseman	United States	Graduation (retired)
Josh Benson	Goaltender	United States	Graduation (retired)
Nick Boyagian	Forward	United States	Graduate transfer to New Haven
Troy Conzo	Forward	United States	Graduation (retired)
Ryan Doolin	Forward	United States	Transferred to Colby
Dante Fantauzzi	Defenseman	Canada	Left program (retired)
Dante Palecco	Forward	United States	Graduation (retired)
Dan Petrick	Defenseman	United States	Left program (retired)
Dakota Raabe	Forward	United States	Graduation (signed with Utah Grizzlies)
Rourke Russell	Defenseman	United States	Graduation (signed with Adirondack Thunder)
Adam Tisdale	Forward	Canada	Graduate transfer to Alaska Anchorage

== Recruiting ==
Player	Position	Nationality	Age	Notes
Aidan Connolly	Forward	United States	20	Marshfield, MA
Chikara Hanzawa	Forward	Japan	21	Tokyo, JPN
Marcus Joughin	Forward	Canada	21	Tecumseh, ON
Brendan Kennette	Defenseman	Canada	20	Windsor, ON
Julian Kislin	Defenseman	United States	23	Manalapan, NJ; graduate transfer from Northeastern
Brandon Milberg	Goaltender	Canada	21	Thornhill, ON
Dylan Robbins	Forward	United States	21	Alpine, NJ

== Roster ==
As of August 16, 2022.

No.	Nat.	Player	Class	Pos	Height	Weight	DoB	Hometown	Previous team	NHL rights
1	(Canada)	Brandon Milberg	Freshman	G	6' 1" (1.85 m)	181 lb (82 kg)	2001-07-16	Thornhill, Ontario	Wichita Falls Warriors (NAHL)	—
2	(United States)	Julian Kislin	Graduate	D	6' 1" (1.85 m)	190 lb (86 kg)	1999-05-24	Manalapan, New Jersey	Northeastern (HEA)	—
3	(United States)	Grant Anderson	Junior	D	6' 2" (1.88 m)	180 lb (82 kg)	1999-09-15	Plymouth, Minnesota	Omaha Lancers (USHL)	—
4	(Denmark)	Jeppe Urup	Senior	D	6' 2" (1.88 m)	196 lb (89 kg)	1999-03-14	Odense, Denmark	Youngstown Phantoms (USHL)	—
5	(United States)	Andrius Kulbis-Marino	Junior	D	6' 0" (1.83 m)	184 lb (83 kg)	2000-02-16	Methuen, Massachusetts	Maine Nordiques (NAHL)	—
6	(United States)	Logan Britt	Senior	D	6' 2" (1.88 m)	190 lb (86 kg)	1999-02-10	Crystal Lake, Illinois	Quinnipiac (ECAC)	—
8	(United States)	Hunter Sansbury	Sophomore	D	5' 11" (1.8 m)	180 lb (82 kg)	2000-10-08	Lomita, California	Salmon Arm Silverbacks (BCHL)	—
9	(Canada)	Daniel Ebrahim	Sophomore	F	5' 11" (1.8 m)	180 lb (82 kg)	2000-07-12	Brooklin, Ontario	Jersey Hitmen (NCDC)	—
10	(Japan)	Chikara Hanzawa	Freshman	F	5' 6" (1.68 m)	160 lb (73 kg)	2001-07-12	Tokyo, Japan	South Shore Kings (NCDC)	—
11	(Canada)	Ryan Steele (C)	Graduate	F	6' 1" (1.85 m)	190 lb (86 kg)	1997-09-13	Stratford, Prince Edward Island	West Kelowna Warriors (BCHL)	—
12	(United States)	Kevin Lombardi	Senior	F	6' 5" (1.96 m)	230 lb (104 kg)	1998-08-12	Schwenksville, Pennsylvania	Sioux City Musketeers (USHL)	—
13	(United States)	Cody Hoban	Junior	F	5' 9" (1.75 m)	180 lb (82 kg)	2001-04-26	Guilford, Connecticut	Danbury Jr. Hat Tricks (NAHL)	—
14	(Canada)	Brendan Kennette	Freshman	D	6' 2" (1.88 m)	190 lb (86 kg)	2002-06-09	Windsor, Ontario	Brooks Bandits (AJHL)	—
16	(United States)	Dylan Robbins	Freshman	F	6' 0" (1.83 m)	175 lb (79 kg)	2001-08-29	Alpine, New Jersey	Chicago Steel (USHL)	—
17	(United States)	Aidan Connolly	Freshman	F	5' 11" (1.8 m)	185 lb (84 kg)	2001-10-05	Marshfield, Massachusetts	Maine Nordiques (NAHL)	—
18	(United States)	John Jaworski	Junior	F	5' 10" (1.78 m)	165 lb (75 kg)	2000-03-20	Grinnell, Iowa	Chicago Steel (USHL)	—
20	(United States)	Blake Humphrey	Freshman	F	5' 8" (1.73 m)	162 lb (73 kg)	2002-01-18	Syracuse, New York	Sioux Falls Stampede (USHL)	—
21	(United States)	Tim Clifton	Senior	F	6' 0" (1.83 m)	200 lb (91 kg)	1998-02-23	Farmingdale, New Jersey	Shreveport Mudbugs (NAHL)	—
22	(United States)	Conner Hutchison	Sophomore	D	5' 10" (1.78 m)	170 lb (77 kg)	2000-06-02	Hicksville, New York	Tri-City Storm (USHL)	—
23	(Canada)	Braeden Tuck (C)	Senior	F	6' 1" (1.85 m)	170 lb (77 kg)	1998-04-15	Calgary, Alberta	Trail Smoke Eaters (BCHL)	—
24	(United States)	Austin Magera	Graduate	F	6' 1" (1.85 m)	185 lb (84 kg)	1998-07-19	Suwanee, Georgia	Lincoln Stars (USHL)	—
25	(Canada)	Dante Fantauzzi	Junior	D	6' 2" (1.88 m)	195 lb (88 kg)	2000-05-01	North York, Ontario	Sioux Falls Stampede (USHL)	—
26	(United States)	Neil Shea (A)	Senior	F	6' 1" (1.85 m)	200 lb (91 kg)	1999-07-29	Marshfield, Massachusetts	Northeastern (HEA)	—
27	(United States)	Patrick Dawson (A)	Senior	D	6' 0" (1.83 m)	182 lb (83 kg)	1999-01-14	Medway, Massachusetts	Odessa Jackalopes (NAHL)	—
28	(Canada)	Marcus Joughin	Freshman	F	5' 11" (1.8 m)	180 lb (82 kg)	2001-07-05	Tecumseh, Ontario	West Kelowna Warriors (BCHL)	—
29	(United States)	Todd Goehring (A)	Graduate	F	5' 11" (1.8 m)	175 lb (79 kg)	1997-07-08	Wayside, New Jersey	Chicago Steel (USHL)	—
30	(United States)	Jack O'Dea	Sophomore	G	5' 9" (1.75 m)	148 lb (67 kg)	2000-09-07	Brighton, Massachusetts	Bridgton Academy (USHS–ME)	—
31	(United States)	Justin Robbins	Senior	G	5' 8" (1.73 m)	160 lb (73 kg)	1999-03-10	Alpine, New Jersey	Arizona State (NCAA)	—
33	(Canada)	Luke Lush	Senior	G	6' 3" (1.91 m)	205 lb (93 kg)	1998-02-15	Sherwood Park, Alberta	Drayton Valley Thunder (AJHL)	—

== Standings ==
2022–23 Atlantic Hockey Standings
	Conference record										Overall record					
	GP	W	L	T	OW	OL	SW	PTS	GF	GA	GP	W	L	T	GF	GA
RIT †	26	18	7	1	1	3	0	57	85	55	39	25	13	1	127	100
American International	26	14	8	4	2	0	3	47	87	62	39	18	14	7	124	98
Sacred Heart	26	14	9	3	2	0	2	45	87	72	37	17	17	3	107	112
Canisius *	26	13	10	3	3	1	1	41	76	71	42	20	19	3	118	119
Army	26	12	12	2	3	3	1	39	72	81	37	14	19	4	98	119
Niagara	26	10	13	3	0	3	2	38	73	86	40	19	18	3	119	129
Holy Cross	26	12	12	2	3	1	1	37	73	71	41	17	21	3	98	119
Mercyhurst	26	9	14	3	1	5	1	35	77	80	36	10	23	3	98	122
Bentley	26	8	16	2	1	1	1	27	61	89	34	11	21	2	81	124
Air Force	26	8	17	1	1	0	0	24	63	87	36	12	22	2	95	128
Championship: March 18, 2023 † indicates conference regular season champion (DeGregorio Trophy) * indicates conference tournament champion (Riley Trophy); Rankings: USCHO.com Top 20 Poll

== Schedule and results ==
Date	Time	Opponent^{#}	Rank^{#}	Site	TV	Decision	Result	Attendance	Record
Exhibition
October 1	7:00 PM	at #10 Massachusetts*		Mullins Center • Amherst, Massachusetts (Exhibition)		Robbins	W 3–2		
October 2	3:00 PM	Western Ontario*		Total Mortgage Arena • Bridgeport, Connecticut (Exhibition)	FloHockey		W 6–4		
Regular Season
October 7	7:00 PM	at #16 Providence*		Schneider Arena • Providence, Rhode Island	ESPN+	Robbins	L 1–6	2,706	0–1–0
October 13	7:00 PM	at Holy Cross		Hart Center • Worcester, Massachusetts	FloHockey	Robbins	W 3–2	327	1–1–0 (1–0–0)
October 14	7:00 PM	at Holy Cross		Hart Center • Worcester, Massachusetts	FloHockey	Lush	W 5–1	246	2–1–0 (2–0–0)
October 21	7:30 PM	at Niagara		Dwyer Arena • Lewiston, New York	FloHockey	Lush	L 4–6	704	2–2–0 (2–1–0)
October 22	5:30 PM	at Niagara		Dwyer Arena • Lewiston, New York	FloHockey	Lush	W 5–1	661	3–2–0 (3–1–0)
October 28	7:00 PM	Canisius		Total Mortgage Arena • Bridgeport, Connecticut	FloHockey	Lush	W 6–3	754	4–2–0 (4–1–0)
October 29	4:00 PM	Canisius		Total Mortgage Arena • Bridgeport, Connecticut	FloHockey	Lush	W 3–1	584	5–2–0 (5–1–0)
November 4	7:00 PM	at Mercyhurst		Mercyhurst Ice Center • Erie, Pennsylvania	FloHockey	Lush	W 6–3	624	6–2–0 (6–1–0)
November 5	4:05 PM	at Mercyhurst		Mercyhurst Ice Center • Erie, Pennsylvania	FloHockey	Lush	T 3–3 ^{SOW}	212	6–2–1 (6–1–1)
November 11	7:05 PM	at RIT		Gene Polisseni Center • Henrietta, New York	FloHockey	Lush	L 1–3	2,394	6–3–1 (6–2–1)
November 12	5:05 PM	at RIT		Gene Polisseni Center • Henrietta, New York	FloHockey	Lush	L 1–3	2,508	6–4–1 (6–3–1)
November 17	7:05 PM	#15 Merrimack*		Total Mortgage Arena • Bridgeport, Connecticut	FloHockey	Lush	L 0–3	803	6–5–1
November 22	7:00 PM	at Cornell*		Lynah Rink • Ithaca, New York	ESPN+	Lush	L 1–2	2,772	6–6–1
November 25	7:00 PM	Bentley		Total Mortgage Arena • Bridgeport, Connecticut	FloHockey	Lush	L 1–3	708	6–7–1 (6–4–1)
November 26	7:00 PM	Bentley		Total Mortgage Arena • Bridgeport, Connecticut	FloHockey	Lush	W 6–3	687	7–7–1 (7–4–1)
December 6	7:05 PM	Northeastern*		Total Mortgage Arena • Bridgeport, Connecticut	FloHockey	Lush	W 4–2	1,004	8–7–1
December 29	7:00 PM	Mercyhurst		Total Mortgage Arena • Bridgeport, Connecticut	FloHockey	Milberg	W 4–3 ^{OT}	804	9–7–1 (8–4–1)
December 30	4:00 PM	Mercyhurst		Total Mortgage Arena • Bridgeport, Connecticut	FloHockey	Lush	W 4–1	981	10–7–1 (9–4–1)
January 5	7:00 PM	Army		Total Mortgage Arena • Bridgeport, Connecticut	FloHockey	Lush	W 5–0	748	11–7–1 (10–4–1)
January 8	4:00 PM	at New Hampshire*		Whittemore Center • Durham, New Hampshire	ESPN+	Lush	L 1–4	4,205	11–8–1
January 14	7:00 PM	#20 Boston College*		Martire Family Arena • Fairfield, Connecticut	FloHockey, SNY	Lush	L 2–3	4,103	11–9–1
January 20	7:00 PM	Holy Cross		Martire Family Arena • Fairfield, Connecticut	FloHockey, SNY	Lush	T 2–2 ^{SOW}	4,223	11–9–2 (10–4–2)
January 21	7:00 PM	Holy Cross		Martire Family Arena • Fairfield, Connecticut	FloHockey, SNY	Lush	W 4–1	4,296	12–9–2 (11–4–2)
Connecticut Hockey Tournament
January 27	7:00 PM	at #3 Quinnipiac*		M&T Bank Arena • Hamden, Connecticut (Connecticut Ice Semifinal)		Lush	L 0–5	3,625	12–10–2
January 28	4:00 PM	vs. Yale*		M&T Bank Arena • Hamden, Connecticut (Connecticut Ice Consolation)		Milberg	W 4–3	-	13–10–2
February 2	7:05 PM	at American International		MassMutual Center • Springfield, Massachusetts	FloHockey	Lush	W 4–2	363	14–10–2 (12–4–2)
February 4	7:00 PM	American International		Martire Family Arena • Fairfield, Connecticut	FloHockey	Lush	L 1–4	4,267	14–11–2 (12–5–2)
February 7	7:00 PM	Army		Martire Family Arena • Fairfield, Connecticut	FloHockey, SNY	Lush	L 1–4	2,643	14–12–2 (12–6–2)
February 10	7:00 PM	Air Force		Martire Family Arena • Fairfield, Connecticut	FloHockey, SNY	Lush	L 4–5	4,087	14–13–2 (12–7–2)
February 11	7:00 PM	Air Force		Martire Family Arena • Fairfield, Connecticut	FloHockey	Lush	W 5–3	4,152	15–13–2 (13–7–2)
February 18	7:00 PM	at Canisius		LECOM Harborcenter • Buffalo, New York	FloHockey	Lush	L 4–6	973	15–14–2 (13–8–2)
February 19	7:00 PM	at Canisius		LECOM Harborcenter • Buffalo, New York	FloHockey	Lush	W 3–2 ^{OT}	813	16–14–2 (14–8–2)
February 24	7:05 PM	at American International		MassMutual Center • Springfield, Massachusetts	FloHockey	Lush	T 2–2 ^{SOL}	-	16–14–3 (14–8–3)
February 25	7:00 PM	American International		Martire Family Arena • Fairfield, Connecticut	FloHockey	Lush	L 0–5	4,225	16–15–3 (14–7–3)
Atlantic Hockey Tournament
March 3	7:00 PM	Niagara*		Martire Family Arena • Fairfield, Connecticut (Quarterfinal Game 1)	FloHockey	Lush	W 3–1	2,046	17–15–3
March 4	7:00 PM	Niagara*		Martire Family Arena • Fairfield, Connecticut (Quarterfinal Game 2)	FloHockey	Lush	L 1–4	2,088	17–16–3
March 5	7:00 PM	Niagara*		Martire Family Arena • Fairfield, Connecticut (Quarterfinal Game 3)	FloHockey	Lush	L 3–7	1,196	17–17–3
*Non-conference game. ^{#}Rankings from USCHO.com Poll. All times are in Eastern Time. Source:

== Scoring statistics ==
Name	Position	Games	Goals	Assists	Points	PIM
Neil Shea	F	37	14	16	30	12
Austin Magera	C	37	8	20	28	26
Kevin Lombardi	RW	36	12	12	24	23
Marcus Joughin	F	35	8	16	24	12
Todd Goehring	F	37	11	11	22	6
Braeden Tuck	F	37	5	15	20	4
Conner Hutchison	D	34	3	17	20	6
Ryan Steele	F	26	10	9	19	10
Hunter Sansbury	D	37	7	11	18	23
Blake Humphrey	F	37	4	10	14	10
Daniel Ebrahim	F	27	7	6	13	10
John Jaworski	F	36	3	10	13	22
Logan Britt	D	37	2	10	12	24
Julian Kislin	D	30	2	5	7	10
Dante Fantauzzi	D	33	2	3	5	23
Aidan Connolly	F	15	4	0	4	0
Patrick Dawson	D	36	2	2	4	10
Chikara Hanzawa	F	28	1	3	4	10
Tim Clifton	C	34	1	2	3	8
Grant Anderson	D	13	0	2	2	2
Luke Lush	G	35	0	2	2	2
Dylan Robbins	F	31	1	0	1	6
Brendan Kennette	D	5	0	1	1	8
Andrius Kulbis-Marino	D	13	0	1	1	4
Jack O'Dea	G	1	0	0	0	0
Jeppe Urup Mogensen	D	1	0	0	0	0
Justin Robbins	G	2	0	0	0	0
Brandon Milberg	G	3	0	0	0	0
Cody Hoban	F	7	0	0	0	0
Bench	-	-	-	-	-	2
Total			107	184	291	275

== Goaltending statistics ==
Name	Games	Minutes	Wins	Losses	Ties	Goals against	Saves	Shut outs	SV %	GAA
Jack O'Dea	1	0:07	0	0	0	0	0	0	1.000	0.00
Luke Lush	35	2003:54	14	16	3	90	802	1	.899	2.69
Brandon Millberg	3	108:05	2	0	0	7	44	0	.863	3.89
Justin Robbins	2	100	1	1	0	7	35	0	.833	4.20
Empty Net	-	28:45	-	-	-	8	-	-	-	-
Total	37	2240:51	17	17	3	112	881	1	.894	2.82

== Rankings ==
Poll	Week																											
Poll	Pre	1	2	3	4	5	6	7	8	9	10	11	12	13	14	15	16	17	18	19	20	21	22	23	24	25	26	27 (Final)
USCHO.com	NR	-	NR	NR	NR	NR	NR	NR	NR	NR	NR	NR	NR	-	NR	NR	NR	NR	NR	NR	NR	NR	NR	NR	NR	NR	-	NR
USA Today	NR	NR	NR	NR	NR	NR	NR	NR	NR	NR	NR	NR	NR	NR	NR	NR	NR	NR	NR	NR	NR	NR	NR	NR	NR	NR	NR	NR

Note: USCHO did not release a poll in weeks 1, 13, or 26.

== Awards and honors ==
Player	Award	Ref
Braeden Tuck	Atlantic Hockey Individual Sportsmanship Award	
Sacred Heart Pioneers	Team Sportsmanship Award	
Neil Shea	Atlantic Hockey First Team	
Hunter Sansbury	Atlantic Hockey Third Team	
Marcus Joughin	Atlantic Hockey Rookie Team	
