= 2022–23 Bentley Falcons men's ice hockey season =

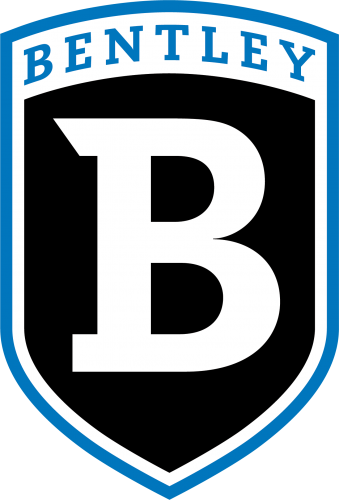
- Conference: 9th Atlantic Hockey
- Home ice: Bentley Arena

Rankings
- USCHO: NR
- USA Today: NR

Record
- Overall: 11–21–2
- Conference: 8–16–2
- Home: 4–10–2
- Road: 7–11–0

Coaches and captains
- Head coach: Ryan Soderquist
- Assistant coaches: Jon Coleman; Stephen Needham; Cam Doomany
- Captain(s): Dylan Pitera; Marcus Walter
- Alternate captain(s): Cole Kodsi; Joe Winkelmann

The 2022–23 Bentley Falcons men's ice hockey season was the 46th season of play for the program, the 24th at the Division I level, and the 20th in the Atlantic Hockey conference. The Falcons represented Bentley University and were coached by Ryan Soderquist, in his 21st season.

== Season ==
With more than half of the players from the previous season's team departing, coach Soderquist had his work cut out for him. The new lineup displayed some obvious deficiencies early in the year, both on the offense and defense. The result was a rather poor record and a last-place position in the conference standings. Once the team returned from the winter break, they seemed to have built some amount of chemistry and produced a surprising upset over Northeastern.

The Falcons were much better in the second half of the season and nearly posted a .500 record in 2023. Towards the end of the season they were able to produce wins over both American International and RIT, the top two teams in the conference. One of the big keys to this was the emergence of Connor Hasley as the team's starting goaltender. Unfortunately, because of both their bad start and the fact that Atlantic Hockey had altered its playoff format for this season to eliminate the First Round, Bentley's 9th-place finish left them out of the bracket and without a single playoff game.

== Departures ==
Player	Position	Nationality	Cause
Drew Bavaro	Defenseman	United States	Transferred to Notre Dame
Matt Clark	Defenseman	United States	Left program (retired)
Evan Debrouwer	Goaltender	Canada	Graduation (retired)
Jason Grande	Goaltender	United States	Transferred to Holy Cross
Brendan Hamblet	Forward	United States	Graduation (retired)
Fraser Kirk	Goaltender	Canada	Graduation (retired)
Phil Knies	Forward	Slovakia	Graduation (signed with HK Nitra)
Matt Lombardozzi	Defenseman	United States	Graduation (retired)
Luke Orysiuk	Defenseman	Canada	Graduation (signed with Trois-Rivières Lions)
Ethan Roswell	Defenseman	United States	Graduation (signed with Corsaires de Dunkerque)
Collin Rutherford	Forward	United States	Graduation (retired)
Kohei Sato	Forward	Japan	Graduation (retired)
Will Schlagenhauf	Forward	United States	Graduation (retired)
A. J. Villella	Defenseman	United States	Graduation (retired)
Brendan Walkom	Forward	United States	Graduation (signed with Bees IHC)
Michael Zuffante	Forward	United States	Graduation (retired)

== Recruiting ==
Player	Position	Nationality	Age	Notes
Seth Bernard-Docker	Defenseman	Canada	20	Canmore, AB
Nick Bochen	Defenseman	Canada	22	North Vancouver, BC; transfer from Quinnipiac
Stevie Castagna	Forward	Canada	21	North Vancouver, BC
Connor Hasley	Goaltender	United States	21	North Tonawanda, NY
Josh Latta	Forward	United States	24	West Vancouver, BC; transfer from Massachusetts Lowell
Pat Lawn	Defenseman	United States	21	Waltham, MA
Ethan Leyh	Forward	Canada	21	Anmore, BC; transfer from Quinnipiac
Arlo Merritt	Forward	Canada	21	Halifax, NS
Ryan Nause	Defenseman	Canada	21	Riverview, NB
Nicholas Niemo	Forward	United States	21	Middlebury, VT
Jordan Schulting	Defenseman	Canada	23	Penticton, BC; transfer from Massachusetts Lowell
Joshua Seeley	Goaltender	United States	21	Trenton, MI
Matt Thomson	Forward	United States	23	Reading, MA; transfer from Northeastern; joined mid-season
Ryan Upson	Forward	Canada	21	West Vancouver, BC

== Roster ==
As of January 1, 2023.

No.	Nat.	Player	Class	Pos	Height	Weight	DoB	Hometown	Previous team	NHL rights
2	(United States)	Matt Thompson	Senior	F	6' 1" (1.85 m)	194 lb (88 kg)	1998-11-07	Reading, Massachusetts	EHC Neuwied (Regionalliga)	—
4	(Canada)	Marcus Walter (C)	Senior	D	6' 3" (1.91 m)	210 lb (95 kg)	1999-06-14	St. Albert, Alberta	Alberni Valley Bulldogs (BCHL)	—
5	(Canada)	Nick Bochen	Junior	D	5' 9" (1.75 m)	170 lb (77 kg)	2001-08-29	North Vancouver, British Columbia	Quinnipiac (ECAC)	—
6	(Canada)	Seth Bernard-Docker	Freshman	D	6' 0" (1.83 m)	194 lb (88 kg)	2001-10-30	Canmore, Alberta	Sioux Falls Stampede (USHL)	—
7	(United States)	Ethan Harrison	Junior	F	6' 0" (1.83 m)	180 lb (82 kg)	2000-10-30	Plano, Texas	Sioux City Musketeers (USHL)	—
9	(Canada)	Josh Latta	Senior	F	5' 11" (1.8 m)	180 lb (82 kg)	1998-08-14	West Vancouver, British Columbia	Massachusetts Lowell (HEA)	—
10	(United States)	Dylan Pitera (C)	Graduate	F	6' 2" (1.88 m)	195 lb (88 kg)	1999-07-04	Culver, Indiana	Culver Academies (Midget AAA)	—
11	(United States)	Eric Linell	Senior	F	5' 10" (1.78 m)	175 lb (79 kg)	1998-09-17	Great Neck, New York	Connecticut (HEA)	—
12	(Canada)	Danny Pearson	Sophomore	F	5' 10" (1.78 m)	185 lb (84 kg)	2000-06-01	Vancouver, British Columbia	Coquitlam Express (BCHL)	—
13	(United States)	Matt Gosiewski	Senior	F	6' 5" (1.96 m)	220 lb (100 kg)	1998-05-10	Wilton, Connecticut	Wenatchee Wild (BCHL)	—
14	(United States)	Pat Lawn	Freshman	D	6' 0" (1.83 m)	175 lb (79 kg)	2001-03-26	Waltham, Massachusetts	West Kelowna Warriors (BCHL)	—
15	(Canada)	Cooper Connell	Sophomore	F	6' 3" (1.91 m)	190 lb (86 kg)	2001-07-15	West Vancouver, British Columbia	Grande Prairie Storm (AJHL)	—
16	(United States)	Harrison Scott	Sophomore	F	6' 0" (1.83 m)	185 lb (84 kg)	2000-09-27	San Jose, California	Amarillo Bulls (NAHL)	—
17	(Canada)	Stephen Castagna	Freshman	F	5' 9" (1.75 m)	170 lb (77 kg)	2001-08-06	North Vancouver, British Columbia	Alberni Valley Bulldogs (BCHL)	—
18	(Canada)	Arlo Merritt	Freshman	F	6' 3" (1.91 m)	215 lb (98 kg)	2001-01-31	Halifax, Nova Scotia	Alberni Valley Bulldogs (BCHL)	—
19	(Canada)	Ethan Leyh	Senior	F	6' 0" (1.83 m)	195 lb (88 kg)	2001-06-07	Anmore, British Columbia	Quinnipiac (ECAC)	—
20	(United States)	Nicholas Niemo	Freshman	F	5' 11" (1.8 m)	180 lb (82 kg)	2001-03-28	Middlebury, Vermont	Lone Star Brahmas (NAHL)	—
21	(United States)	Cole Kodsi (A)	Junior	F	6' 2" (1.88 m)	195 lb (88 kg)	2000-06-17	Boca Raton, Florida	Omaha Lancers (USHL)	—
22	(Canada)	Jordan Schulting	Senior	D	6' 2" (1.88 m)	190 lb (86 kg)	1999-08-06	Penticton, British Columbia	Massachusetts Lowell (HEA)	—
23	(United States)	Tucker Hodgson	Sophomore	D	6' 3" (1.91 m)	195 lb (88 kg)	2001-06-07	Grand Forks, North Dakota	Fargo (USHL)	—
24	(United States)	Joe Winkelmann (A)	Senior	F	5' 11" (1.8 m)	185 lb (84 kg)	2000-05-08	St. Louis, Missouri	Odessa Jackalopes (NAHL)	—
25	(United States)	Hunter Toale	Senior	D	6' 1" (1.85 m)	175 lb (79 kg)	1999-11-21	Coral Springs, Florida	Johnstown Tomahawks (NAHL)	—
26	(Canada)	Lucas Vanroboys	Senior	F	6' 2" (1.88 m)	190 lb (86 kg)	1999-07-24	Thamesville, Ontario	Prince George Spruce Kings (BCHL)	—
27	(Canada)	Ryan Nause	Freshman	D	5' 11" (1.8 m)	181 lb (82 kg)	2001-08-27	Riverview, New Brunswick	Alberni Valley Bulldogs (BCHL)	—
28	(Canada)	Tanner Main	Sophomore	D	5' 11" (1.8 m)	170 lb (77 kg)	2000-04-03	Welland, Ontario	Prince George Spruce Kings (BCHL)	—
29	(United States)	Nicholas Grabko	Junior	G	6' 0" (1.83 m)	180 lb (82 kg)	2000-02-06	Channahon, Illinois	Green Bay Gamblers (USHL)	—
30	(United States)	Josh Seeley	Freshman	G	6' 4" (1.93 m)	220 lb (100 kg)	2001-05-07	Trenton, Michigan	Minnesota Magicians (NAHL)	—
33	(United States)	Connor Hasley	Freshman	G	6' 1" (1.85 m)	198 lb (90 kg)	2001-02-27	North Tonawanda, New York	Cedar Rapids RoughRiders (USHL)	—
38	(Canada)	Ryan Upson	Freshman	F	6' 0" (1.83 m)	190 lb (86 kg)	2001-03-22	West Vancouver, British Columbia	Langley Rivermen (BCHL)	—

== Standings ==
2022–23 Atlantic Hockey Standings
	Conference record										Overall record					
	GP	W	L	T	OW	OL	SW	PTS	GF	GA	GP	W	L	T	GF	GA
RIT †	26	18	7	1	1	3	0	57	85	55	39	25	13	1	127	100
American International	26	14	8	4	2	0	3	47	87	62	39	18	14	7	124	98
Sacred Heart	26	14	9	3	2	0	2	45	87	72	37	17	17	3	107	112
Canisius *	26	13	10	3	3	1	1	41	76	71	42	20	19	3	118	119
Army	26	12	12	2	3	3	1	39	72	81	37	14	19	4	98	119
Niagara	26	10	13	3	0	3	2	38	73	86	40	19	18	3	119	129
Holy Cross	26	12	12	2	3	1	1	37	73	71	41	17	21	3	98	119
Mercyhurst	26	9	14	3	1	5	1	35	77	80	36	10	23	3	98	122
Bentley	26	8	16	2	1	1	1	27	61	89	34	11	21	2	81	124
Air Force	26	8	17	1	1	0	0	24	63	87	36	12	22	2	95	128
Championship: March 18, 2023 † indicates conference regular season champion (DeGregorio Trophy) * indicates conference tournament champion (Riley Trophy); Rankings: USCHO.com Top 20 Poll

== Schedule and results ==
Date	Time	Opponent^{#}	Rank^{#}	Site	TV	Decision	Result	Attendance	Record
Regular Season
October 1	7:00 pm	at #12 Boston University*		Agganis Arena • Boston, Massachusetts		Grabko	L 2–8	5,504	0–1–0
October 13	7:00 pm	at Union*		Achilles Rink • Schenectady, New York		Grabko	L 1–5	1,455	0–2–0
October 15	5:05 pm	Maine*		Bentley Arena • Waltham, Massachusetts	FloHockey	Hasley	W 5–1	1,600	1–2–0
October 20	7:00 pm	at #16 Ohio State*		Value City Arena • Columbus, Ohio		Hasley	L 2–9	2,611	1–3–0
October 21	7:00 pm	at #16 Ohio State*		Value City Arena • Columbus, Ohio		Grabko	L 1–3	3,005	1–4–0
October 28	7:05 pm	Lindenwood*		Bentley Arena • Waltham, Massachusetts	FloHockey	Grabko	L 3–7	1,405	1–5–0
October 29	4:05 pm	Lindenwood*		Bentley Arena • Waltham, Massachusetts	FloHockey	Hasley	W 3–1	1,205	2–5–0
November 4	7:05 pm	Niagara		Bentley Arena • Waltham, Massachusetts	FloHockey	Hasley	L 0–6	1,267	2–6–0 (0–1–0)
November 5	5:05 pm	Niagara		Bentley Arena • Waltham, Massachusetts	FloHockey	Grabko	L 2–4	1,178	2–7–0 (0–2–0)
November 11	9:05 pm	at Air Force		Cadet Ice Arena • Colorado Springs, Colorado	FloHockey	Grabko	W 5–1	1,507	3–7–0 (1–2–0)
November 12	10:05 pm	at Air Force		Cadet Ice Arena • Colorado Springs, Colorado	Altitude 2	Hasley	L 0–2	1,353	3–8–0 (1–3–0)
November 18	7:00 pm	at Army		Tate Rink • West Point, New York	FloHockey	Grabko	L 0–2	1,286	3–9–0 (1–4–0)
November 19	7:00 pm	at Army		Tate Rink • West Point, New York	FloHockey	Hasley	L 2–5	1,347	3–10–0 (1–5–0)
November 25	4:05 pm	at Sacred Heart		Total Mortgage Arena • Bridgeport, Connecticut	FloHockey	Grabko	W 3–1	708	4–10–0 (2–5–0)
November 26	1:05 pm	at Sacred Heart		Total Mortgage Arena • Bridgeport, Connecticut	FloHockey	Hasley	L 3–6	687	4–11–0 (2–6–0)
December 1	7:05 pm	at American International		MassMutual Center • Springfield, Massachusetts	FloHockey	Grabko	L 2–7	181	4–12–0 (2–7–0)
December 2	7:05 pm	American International		Bentley Arena • Waltham, Massachusetts	FloHockey	Grabko	L 1–5	1,442	4–13–0 (2–8–0)
December 30	7:05 pm	Northeastern*		Bentley Arena • Waltham, Massachusetts	FloHockey	Grabko	W 3–1	1,780	5–13–0
January 6	7:05 pm	RIT		Bentley Arena • Waltham, Massachusetts	FloHockey	Grabko	L 0–3	1,483	5–14–0 (2–9–0)
January 7	4:05 pm	RIT		Bentley Arena • Waltham, Massachusetts	FloHockey	Hasley	L 1–3	1,555	5–15–0 (2–10–0)
January 13	7:05 pm	at Niagara		Dwyer Arena • Lewiston, New York	FloHockey	Grabko	W 6–3	587	6–15–0 (3–10–0)
January 14	5:30 pm	at Niagara		Dwyer Arena • Lewiston, New York	FloHockey	Hasley	W 6–1	625	7–15–0 (4–10–0)
January 20	7:05 pm	Canisius		Bentley Arena • Waltham, Massachusetts	FloHockey	Grabko	L 1–5	1,450	7–16–0 (4–11–0)
January 21	4:05 pm	Canisius		Bentley Arena • Waltham, Massachusetts	FloHockey	Hasley	T 2–2 ^{SOW}	1,300	7–16–1 (4–11–1)
January 27	7:05 pm	at Mercyhurst		Mercyhurst Ice Center • Erie, Pennsylvania	FloHockey	Hasley	L 3–4	-	7–17–1 (4–12–1)
January 28	4:05 pm	at Mercyhurst		Mercyhurst Ice Center • Erie, Pennsylvania	FloHockey	Grabko	W 5–3	682	8–17–1 (5–12–1)
February 3	7:05 pm	Holy Cross		Bentley Arena • Waltham, Massachusetts	FloHockey	Grabko	L 1–4	1,678	8–18–1 (5–13–1)
February 4	7:05 pm	Holy Cross		Bentley Arena • Waltham, Massachusetts	FloHockey	Hasley	L 2–3 ^{OT}	1,246	8–19–1 (5–14–1)
February 8	7:05 pm	at American International		MassMutual Center • Springfield, Massachusetts	FloHockey	Hasley	W 4–3	277	9–19–1 (6–14–1)
February 10	7:05 pm	American International		Bentley Arena • Waltham, Massachusetts	FloHockey	Hasley	T 2–2 ^{SOL}	1,620	9–19–2 (6–14–2)
February 17	7:05 pm	at RIT		Gene Polisseni Center • Henrietta, New York	FloHockey	Hasley	L 0–4	2,030	9–20–2 (6–15–2)
February 18	5:05 pm	at RIT		Gene Polisseni Center • Henrietta, New York	FloHockey	Hasley	W 2–1	2,997	10–20–2 (7–15–2)
February 24	7:05 pm	Army		Bentley Arena • Waltham, Massachusetts	FloHockey	Hasley	L 3–5	1,555	10–21–2 (7–16–2)
February 25	4:05 pm	Army		Bentley Arena • Waltham, Massachusetts	FloHockey	Hasley	W 5–4 ^{OT}	1,501	11–21–2 (8–16–2)
*Non-conference game. ^{#}Rankings from USCHO.com Poll. All times are in Eastern Time. Source:

== Scoring statistics ==
Name	Position	Games	Goals	Assists	Points	PIM
Nicholas Niemo	F	32	8	14	22	33
Nick Bochen	D	34	5	15	20	14
Lucas Vanroboys	F	32	4	16	20	65
Cole Kodsi	LW	34	7	9	16	12
Matt Gosiewski	C	33	2	14	16	10
Harrison Scott	F	32	8	7	15	30
Stephen Castagna	F	33	7	8	15	20
Dylan Pitera	F	33	9	5	14	16
Arlo Merritt	C	28	5	7	12	12
Josh Latta	F	27	3	6	9	16
Danny Pearson	F	22	5	2	7	4
Ryan Nause	D	24	2	5	7	20
Joe Winkelmann	C	30	2	5	7	4
Seth Bernard-Docker	D	20	1	6	7	22
Ethan Harrison	F	20	3	3	6	2
Hunter Toale	D	26	2	3	5	6
Pat Lawn	D	29	2	2	4	16
Marcus Walter	D	24	0	4	4	8
Jordan Schulting	D	15	0	4	4	2
Eric Linell	RW	25	1	2	3	6
Tucker Hodgson	D	33	1	2	3	35
Matt Thomson	LW	13	1	1	2	19
Tanner Main	D	22	1	1	2	10
Ryan Upson	F	14	1	1	2	4
Cooper Connell	F	10	1	0	1	4
Nicholas Grabko	G	16	0	0	0	0
Josh Seeley	G	1	0	0	0	0
Connor Hasley	G	20	0	0	0	0
Bench		-	-	-	-	16
Total			81	142	223	406

== Goaltending statistics ==
Name	Games	Minutes	Wins	Losses	Ties	Goals Against	Saves	Shut Outs	SV %	GAA
Connor Hasley	20	1100:07	6	10	2	54	544	1	.910	2.95
Nicholas Grabko	16	909:33	5	11	0	56	428	0	.884	3.69
Josh Seeley	1	27:59	0	0	0	4	19	0	.826	8.58
Empty Net	-	16:39	-	-	-	10	-	-	-	-
Total	36	2054:18	11	21	2	124	991	1	.889	3.62

== Rankings ==
Poll	Week																											
Poll	Pre	1	2	3	4	5	6	7	8	9	10	11	12	13	14	15	16	17	18	19	20	21	22	23	24	25	26	27 (Final)
USCHO.com	NR	-	NR	NR	NR	NR	NR	NR	NR	NR	NR	NR	NR	-	NR	NR	NR	NR	NR	NR	NR	NR	NR	NR	NR	NR	-	NR
USA Today	NR	NR	NR	NR	NR	NR	NR	NR	NR	NR	NR	NR	NR	NR	NR	NR	NR	NR	NR	NR	NR	NR	NR	NR	NR	NR	NR	NR

Note: USCHO did not release a poll in weeks 1, 13, or 26.

== Awards and honors ==
Player	Award	Ref
Nicholas Niemo	Atlantic Hockey Rookie Team	
