= Nick Bowman =

American basketball coach

Current position
- Title: Head coach
- Team: UTSA
- Conference: American
- Record: 3–2 (.600)

Biographical details
- Education: Eastern Kentucky

Coaching career (HC unless noted)
- 2011–2012: Pikeville (assistant)
- 2012–2013: Eastern Kentucky (GA)
- 2013–2014: Tennessee (operations assistant)
- 2018–2021: Nicholls (assistant)
- 2021–2023: Nicholls (associate head coach)
- 2023–2024: New Orleans (assistant)
- 2024–2026: UTSA (assistant)
- 2026–present: UTSA (interim HC)

Administrative career (AD unless noted)
- 2014–2015: Eastern Kentucky (DBO)
- 2015–2018: Clemson (director of recruiting)

Head coaching record
- Overall: 3–2 (.600)

Nick Bowman is an American basketball coach. He is currently the interim head coach of the UTSA Roadrunners men's basketball team.

== Career ==
Bowman attended Eastern Kentucky University and served as a student manager for the men's basketball team from 2008 to 2011. After graduating, he was hired as an assistant at Pikeville. After a season at Pikeville, Bowman served as a graduate assistant at Eastern Kentucky and an operations assistant at Tennessee. After a season with Tennessee, he returned to Eastern Kentucky as the director of basketball operations. In 2015, Bowman was hired as the director of recruiting at Clemson, a position he served until 2018. In 2018, he was hired as an assistant at Nicholls, and was promoted to associate head coach in 2021. In 2023, Bowman was hired as the head assistant at New Orleans, a position he served for a year. In 2024, he was named an assistant coach at UTSA.

On October 28, 2026, Bowman was named the active head coach for UTSA, after Austin Claunch was suspended. On November 13, he was named the interim head coach.

== Head coaching record ==
Record table
Season	Team	Overall	Conference	Standing	Postseason
UTSA (American Conference) (2026–present)
2026–27	UTSA	3–2	0–0		
UTSA:		3–2 (.600)	0–0 (–)		
Total:		3–2 (.600)			
National champion Postseason invitational champion Conference regular season champion Conference regular season and conference tournament champion Division regular season champion Division regular season and conference tournament champion Conference tournament champion
