= 2022–23 American International Yellow Jackets men's ice hockey season =

- Conference: 2nd Atlantic Hockey
- Home ice: MassMutual Center

Rankings
- USCHO: NR
- USA Today: NR

Record
- Overall: 18–14–7
- Conference: 14–8–4
- Home: 7–8–4
- Road: 11–6–3

Coaches and captains
- Head coach: Eric Lang
- Assistant coaches: Patrick Tabb; Matthew Woodward; Brendan Riley
- Captain(s): Austen Long; Nico Somerville
- Alternate captain(s): Brett Callahan; Nick Cardelli; Luis Lindner; Eric Otto

The 2022–23 American International Yellow Jackets men's ice hockey season was the 75th season of play for the program and 20th in the Atlantic Hockey conference. The Yellow Jackets represented American International College, played their home games at MassMutual Center and were coached by Eric Lang, in his 7th season.

== Season ==
Coming into the season as the three-time reigning Atlantic Hockey champion, AIC's biggest hurdle for a title was the monumental turnover with the roster. With more than half of the team leaving, coach Lang brought in a mix of freshman and transfers to try and plug the holes in the lineup. While the brain trust in goal had left, the Yellow Jackets managed to retain Blake Bennett, the team's leading scorer from the previous year. Even with the reshuffling on the defensive side, AIC posted nearly identical number, allowing 2.45 goals per game. Senior Jarrett Fiske ended up with the lion's share of minutes while transfer Alexandros Aslanidis proved to be a capable backup. The retooled offense was nearly as strong, scoring slightly fewer goals per game. Unfortunately, AIC's overall performance wasn't quite up to the championship standards.

The team got off to a decent start, posting winning records both in and outside their conference. November, however, was not kind to the Yellow Jackets and the team lost four conference matches. From that point on, the Yellow Jackets were playing catchup with RIT. AIC played well for the rest of the regular season, not losing consecutive games for the remainder of the regular season, but they could never match the Tigers and ended up 2nd in the league standings.

Because of the team's poor non-conference results, AIC finished well below the cutoff line for an at-large bid and would have to win the conference tournament to return to the NCAA tournament. The Yellow Jackets opened against Holy Cross and won the first game comfortably. After that the team appear to lose all of its momentum and were outplayed by the Crusaders. AIC was outshot 44–91 in the following two games but the disparity in talent allowed the matches to remain close. After a narrow defeat in the second game, AIC got into a dogfight with Holy Cross in the deciding game. The Yellow Jackets fell behind on three separate occasions but were able to tie the game each time and force the game into overtime. While the play was a little more even in the extra session, the team was unable to stop the Crusaders from netting the winning goal and ending the season for the Yellow Jackets.

== Departures ==
Player	Position	Nationality	Cause
Elijiah Barriga	Forward	United States	Graduation (signed with Dundee Stars)
Alec Calvaruso	Goaltender	United States	Signed professional contract (Greenville Swamp Rabbits)
Justin Cole	Forward	United States	Graduation (retired)
Chris Dodero	Forward	United States	Graduation (signed with HK Olimpija)
Zak Galambos	Defenseman	United States	Transferred to Western Michigan
Santeri Hartikainen	Forward	Finland	Transferred to Long Island
Hunter Johannes	Forward	United States	Transferred to Lindenwood
Jake Kucharski	Goaltender	United States	Transferred to Omaha
Luka Maver	Forward	Slovenia	Graduation (signed with Pioneers Vorarlberg)
Ryan McInchak	Goaltender	United States	Transferred to Cornell
Parker Revering	Defenseman	United States	Graduation (retired)
Brian Rigali	Forward	United States	Graduation (signed with Worcester Railers)
Jake Stella	Forward	Sweden	Transferred to Massachusetts Lowell
Michal Stinil	Forward	Czech Republic	Signed professional contract (Wichita Thunder)
Chris Theodore	Forward	Canada	Graduate transfer to Union
Chris Van Os-Shaw	Forward	Canada	Graduation (signed with Indy Fuel)
Justin Young	Forward	Canada	Graduation (signed with Allen Americans)

== Recruiting ==
Player	Position	Nationality	Age	Notes
Andrew Amousse	Forward	Canada	21	Laval, QC
Alexandros Aslanidis	Goaltender	United States	21	Morristown, NJ; transfer from Western Michigan
Joshua Barnes	Forward	Canada	20	Cornwall, ON
Jordan Biro	Forward	Canada	22	Sherwood Park, AB; transfer from Colorado College
Brennan Boynton	Goaltender	United States	22	Champlin, MN; transfer from Minnesota
Grayson Dietrich	Forward	Canada	20	Calgary, AB
Oscar Geschwind	Forward	Sweden	21	Karlstad, SWE; transfer from Northern Michigan
Timofei Khokhlachev	Forward	Russia	20	Moscow, RUS
Troy Kobryn	Goaltender	United States	23	Hillsborough, NJ; transfer from Merrimack
John Lundy	Forward	United States	21	Brooklyn, NY; joined mid-season
Alexander Malinowski	Forward	Sweden	21	Linköping, SWE
Dustin Manz	Forward	United States	22	Vanderbilt, MI; transfer from Lake Superior State
Hunter McCurdy	Defenseman	United States	21	Mokena, IL
Casey McDonald	Forward	Canada	21	Kindersley, SK
Jake Rosenbaum	Defenseman	United States	25	Laguna Niguel, CA; graduate transfer from Minnesota Duluth
Brett Rylance	Forward	Canada	21	Edmonton, AB
Jake Sacratini	Forward	Canada	21	Pincourt, QC
Casper Söderling	Defenseman	Sweden	21	Stockholm, SWE

== Roster ==
As of September 15, 2022.

No.	Nat.	Player	Class	Pos	Height	Weight	DoB	Hometown	Previous team	NHL rights
1	(United States)	Alexandros Aslanidis	Junior	G	6' 5" (1.96 m)	205 lb (93 kg)	2001-01-20	Moorestown, New Jersey	Western Michigan (NCHC)	—
2	(Canada)	Nico Somerville (C)	Junior	D	5' 9" (1.75 m)	185 lb (84 kg)	1999-04-08	Nanaimo, British Columbia	Penticton (BCHL)	—
3	(United States)	Jake Rosenbaum	Graduate	D	6' 0" (1.83 m)	185 lb (84 kg)	1997-03-28	Trabuco, California	Minnesota Duluth (NCHC)	—
4	(United States)	Brett Callahan (A)	Senior	D	5' 10" (1.78 m)	180 lb (82 kg)	1998-10-16	Westmont, Illinois	Jersey (NCDC)	—
5	(United States)	Alexander Tertyshny	Sophomore	D	6' 0" (1.83 m)	185 lb (84 kg)	2000-01-03	Philadelphia, Pennsylvania	Northeast (NAHL)	—
6	(United States)	Matt Rickard	Junior	D	6' 0" (1.83 m)	180 lb (82 kg)	1999-07-28	Coventry, Rhode Island	Lone Star (NAHL)	—
7	(United States)	Brian Kramer	Junior	D	5' 11" (1.8 m)	185 lb (84 kg)	2000-07-20	Wexford, Pennsylvania	Robert Morris (AHA)	—
8	(Austria)	Luis Lindner (A)	Sophomore	D	5' 11" (1.8 m)	172 lb (78 kg)	2001-05-16	Spittal an der Drau, Austria	Boston Jr. Bruins (NCDC)	—
9	(United States)	Blake Bennett	Senior	F	5' 9" (1.75 m)	182 lb (83 kg)	1998-07-01	Grand Island, New York	Corpus Christi (NAHL)	—
10	(United States)	Dustin Manz	Senior	F	5' 10" (1.78 m)	188 lb (85 kg)	1999-09-21	Vanderbilt, Michigan	Lake Superior State (CCHA)	—
11	(Finland)	Julius Janhonen	Junior	F	6' 1" (1.85 m)	185 lb (84 kg)	1999-03-05	Espoo, Finland	HIFK U20 (Nuorten SM-liiga)	—
12	(United States)	Eric Otto (A)	Senior	F	6' 1" (1.85 m)	175 lb (79 kg)	1997-07-19	Burnsville, Minnesota	Chicago (USHL)	—
13	(Canada)	Grayson Dietrich	Freshman	F	6' 2" (1.88 m)	190 lb (86 kg)	2001-12-18	Calgary, Alberta	Drumheller (AJHL)	—
14	(United States)	Nicholas Cardelli (A)	Graduate	F	5' 10" (1.78 m)	175 lb (79 kg)	1997-06-06	Oak Brook, Illinois	Bemidji State (CCHA)	—
15	(Sweden)	Casper Söderling	Freshman	D	6' 0" (1.83 m)	175 lb (79 kg)	2001-06-02	Stockholm, Sweden	Nacka J20 (J20 Regional)	—
16	(United States)	Reggie Millette	Sophomore	F	6' 0" (1.83 m)	195 lb (88 kg)	2000-04-10	Jacksonville, Florida	Austin (NAHL)	—
17	(Sweden)	Oscar Geschwind	Sophomore	F	6' 0" (1.83 m)	195 lb (88 kg)	2001-02-24	Hällefors, Sweden	Northern Michigan (CCHA)	—
19	(Canada)	Jordan Biro	Junior	F	5' 8" (1.73 m)	160 lb (73 kg)	2000-08-10	Sherwood Park, Alberta	Colorado College (NCHC)	—
20	(United States)	Hunter McCurdy	Freshman	D	6' 1" (1.85 m)	220 lb (100 kg)	2001-08-09	Mokena, Illinois	Danbury (NAHL)	—
21	(United States)	John Lundy	Freshman	F	5' 9" (1.75 m)	163 lb (74 kg)	2001-04-27	Brooklyn, New York	Jamestown (NAHL)	—
22	(Russia)	Timofei Khokhlachev	Freshman	F	6' 4" (1.93 m)	220 lb (100 kg)	2001-11-06	Moscow, Russia	Shreveport (NAHL)	—
23	(United States)	Aaron Grounds	Junior	F	6' 3" (1.91 m)	190 lb (86 kg)	1999-12-24	Jamestown, North Dakota	Fargo (USHL)	—
24	(United States)	Zach Purcell	Sophomore	F	5' 8" (1.73 m)	170 lb (77 kg)	2000-06-13	Parker, Colorado	Lone Star (NAHL)	—
25	(Sweden)	Alexander Malinowski	Freshman	F	5' 11" (1.8 m)	185 lb (84 kg)	2001-02-07	Linköping, Sweden	Fairbanks (NAHL)	—
26	(Canada)	Jake Sacratini	Freshman	F	5' 9" (1.75 m)	172 lb (78 kg)	2001-05-19	Pincourt, Quebec	Notre Dame (SJHL)	—
27	(Canada)	Josh Barnes	Freshman	F	5' 10" (1.78 m)	175 lb (79 kg)	2002-09-27	Cornwall, Ontario	Des Moines (USHL)	—
28	(Canada)	Andrew Amousse	Freshman	F	6' 3" (1.91 m)	215 lb (98 kg)	2001-07-16	Laval, Quebec	Victoria (BCHL)	—
29	(Canada)	Darwin Lakoduk	Junior	F	5' 10" (1.78 m)	165 lb (75 kg)	2000-01-28	Edmonton, Alberta	Penticton (BCHL)	—
30	(United States)	Troy Kobryn	Graduate	G	6' 0" (1.83 m)	200 lb (91 kg)	1999-02-14	Hillsborough, New Jersey	Merrimack (HEA)	—
33	(United States)	Jarrett Fiske	Senior	G	6' 4" (1.93 m)	195 lb (88 kg)	1999-05-28	Erie, Pennsylvania	Kemptville (CCHL)	—
34	(United States)	Brennan Boynton	Sophomore	G	6' 0" (1.83 m)	180 lb (82 kg)	2000-08-01	Champlin, Minnesota	Minnesota (Big Ten)	—
37	(Sweden)	Evan Stella	Sophomore	D	5' 11" (1.8 m)	180 lb (82 kg)	2001-05-11	Karlstad, Sweden	Dubuque (USHL)	—
44	(United States)	Austen Long (C)	Senior	F	5' 11" (1.8 m)	175 lb (79 kg)	1998-02-15	Minneapolis, Minnesota	Omaha (USHL)	—
55	(Canada)	Brett Rylance	Freshman	F	5' 9" (1.75 m)	167 lb (76 kg)	2001-08-03	Edmonton, Alberta	Chilliwack (BCHL)	—
61	(Canada)	Casey McDonald	Freshman	F	6' 1" (1.85 m)	187 lb (85 kg)	2001-05-10	Plenty, Saskatchewan	Penticton (BCHL)	—

== Standings ==
2022–23 Atlantic Hockey Standings
	Conference record										Overall record					
	GP	W	L	T	OW	OL	SW	PTS	GF	GA	GP	W	L	T	GF	GA
RIT †	26	18	7	1	1	3	0	57	85	55	39	25	13	1	127	100
American International	26	14	8	4	2	0	3	47	87	62	39	18	14	7	124	98
Sacred Heart	26	14	9	3	2	0	2	45	87	72	37	17	17	3	107	112
Canisius *	26	13	10	3	3	1	1	41	76	71	42	20	19	3	118	119
Army	26	12	12	2	3	3	1	39	72	81	37	14	19	4	98	119
Niagara	26	10	13	3	0	3	2	38	73	86	40	19	18	3	119	129
Holy Cross	26	12	12	2	3	1	1	37	73	71	41	17	21	3	98	119
Mercyhurst	26	9	14	3	1	5	1	35	77	80	36	10	23	3	98	122
Bentley	26	8	16	2	1	1	1	27	61	89	34	11	21	2	81	124
Air Force	26	8	17	1	1	0	0	24	63	87	36	12	22	2	95	128
Championship: March 18, 2023 † indicates conference regular season champion (DeGregorio Trophy) * indicates conference tournament champion (Riley Trophy); Rankings: USCHO.com Top 20 Poll

== Schedule and results ==
Date	Time	Opponent^{#}	Rank^{#}	Site	TV	Decision	Result	Attendance	Record
Regular Season
October 1	11:07 PM	at Alaska*		Carlson Center • Fairbanks, Alaska	FloHockey	Fiske	T 1–1 ^{OT}	1,950	0–0–1
October 2	8:07 PM	at Alaska*		Carlson Center • Fairbanks, Alaska	FloHockey	Fiske	L 1–2	1,410	0–1–1
October 8	7:05 PM	#13 Massachusetts*		MassMutual Center • Springfield, Massachusetts	FloHockey	Fiske	T 2–2 ^{OT}	1,144	0–1–2
October 14	7:00 PM	at Niagara		Dwyer Arena • Lewiston, New York	FloHockey	Fiske	W 6–3	903	1–1–2 (1–0–0)
October 15	5:30 PM	at Niagara		Dwyer Arena • Lewiston, New York	FloHockey	Aslanidis	W 5–2	511	2–1–2 (2–0–0)
October 18	7:05 PM	Holy Cross		MassMutual Center • Springfield, Massachusetts	FloHockey	Fiske	L 3–7	254	2–2–2 (2–1–0)
October 22	7:05 PM	Lindenwood*		MassMutual Center • Springfield, Massachusetts	FloHockey	Aslanidis	W 5–0	343	3–2–2
October 23	3:05 PM	Lindenwood*		MassMutual Center • Springfield, Massachusetts	FloHockey	Aslanidis	W 5–3	146	4–2–2
October 28	7:00 PM	at Army		Tate Rink • West Point, New York	FloHockey	Aslanidis	W 8–2	1,492	5–2–2 (3–1–0)
November 5	1:05 PM	RIT		MassMutual Center • Springfield, Massachusetts	FloHockey	Aslanidis	L 3–4	227	5–3–2 (3–2–0)
November 6	3:05 PM	RIT		MassMutual Center • Springfield, Massachusetts	FloHockey	Kobryn	L 2–3	231	5–4–2 (3–3–0)
November 11	7:00 PM	at Canisius		LECOM Harborcenter • Buffalo, New York	FloHockey	Fiske	L 2–5	605	5–5–2 (3–4–0)
November 12	3:00 PM	at Canisius		LECOM Harborcenter • Buffalo, New York	FloHockey	Kobryn	L 2–3	603	5–6–2 (3–5–0)
November 15	7:05 PM	Holy Cross		MassMutual Center • Springfield, Massachusetts	FloHockey	Fiske	W 4–1	193	6–6–2 (4–5–0)
November 19	1:05 PM	Air Force		MassMutual Center • Springfield, Massachusetts	FloHockey	Fiske	T 3–3 ^{SOW}	347	6–6–3 (4–5–1)
November 20	7:05 PM	Air Force		MassMutual Center • Springfield, Massachusetts	FloHockey	Fiske	W 3–1	199	7–6–3 (5–5–1)
November 26	2:00 PM	at Maine*		Alfond Arena • Orono, Maine	ESPN+	Fiske	L 1–5	2,910	7–7–3
December 1	7:05 PM	Bentley		MassMutual Center • Springfield, Massachusetts	FloHockey	Fiske	W 7–2	181	8–7–3 (6–5–1)
December 2	7:05 PM	at Bentley		Bentley Arena • Waltham, Massachusetts	FloHockey	Fiske	W 5–1	1,442	9–7–3 (7–5–1)
December 8	5:05 PM	Niagara		MassMutual Center • Springfield, Massachusetts	FloHockey	Fiske	T 0–0 ^{SOL}	-	9–7–4 (7–5–2)
December 9	1:05 PM	Niagara		MassMutual Center • Springfield, Massachusetts	FloHockey	Fiske	W 4–1	296	10–7–4 (8–5–2)
December 29	7:00 PM	at Cornell*		Lynah Rink • Ithaca, New York	ESPN+	Fiske	L 4–8	2,927	10–8–4
December 30	7:00 PM	at Cornell*		Lynah Rink • Ithaca, New York	ESPN+	Aslanidis	T 3–3 ^{OT}	3,024	10–8–5
January 7	1:05 PM	#17 Massachusetts Lowell*		MassMutual Center • Springfield, Massachusetts	FloHockey	Fiske	L 2–4	449	10–9–5
January 14	7:00 PM	at Vermont*		Gutterson Fieldhouse • Burlington, Vermont	ESPN+	Aslanidis	W 4–0	2,301	11–9–5
January 17	7:00 PM	at Army		Tate Rink • West Point, New York	FloHockey	Aslanidis	W 2–1 ^{OT}	977	12–9–5 (9–5–2)
January 20	7:05 PM	at Mercyhurst		Mercyhurst Ice Center • Erie, Pennsylvania	FloHockey	Aslanidis	L 1–4	600	12–10–5 (9–6–2)
January 21	3:05 PM	at Mercyhurst		Mercyhurst Ice Center • Erie, Pennsylvania	FloHockey	Aslanidis	W 2–1 ^{OT}	354	13–10–5 (10–6–2)
February 2	7:05 PM	Sacred Heart		MassMutual Center • Springfield, Massachusetts	FloHockey	Kobryn	L 2–4	363	13–11–5 (10–7–2)
February 4	7:00 PM	at Sacred Heart		Martire Family Arena • Fairfield, Connecticut	FloHockey	Fiske	W 4–1	4,267	14–11–5 (11–7–2)
February 8	7:05 PM	Bentley		MassMutual Center • Springfield, Massachusetts	FloHockey	Fiske	L 3–4	277	14–12–5 (11–8–2)
February 10	7:05 PM	at Bentley		Bentley Arena • Waltham, Massachusetts	FloHockey	Fiske	T 2–2 ^{SOW}	1,620	14–12–6 (11–8–3)
February 17	9:05 PM	at Air Force		Cadet Ice Arena • Colorado Springs, Colorado	Altitude 2	Fiske	W 3–2	1,850	15–12–6 (12–8–3)
February 18	7:05 PM	at Air Force		Cadet Ice Arena • Colorado Springs, Colorado	FloHockey	Aslanidis	W 4–3	2,299	16–12–6 (13–8–3)
February 24	7:05 PM	Sacred Heart		MassMutual Center • Springfield, Massachusetts	FloHockey	Fiske	T 2–2 ^{SOW}	-	16–12–7 (13–8–4)
February 25	7:00 PM	at Sacred Heart		Martire Family Arena • Fairfield, Connecticut	FloHockey	Fiske	W 5–0	4,225	17–12–7 (14–8–4)
Atlantic Hockey Tournament
March 3	1:05 pm	Holy Cross*		MassMutual Center • Springfield, Massachusetts (Quarterfinal Game 1)	FloHockey	Fiske	W 3–1	147	18–12–7
March 4	1:05 pm	Holy Cross*		MassMutual Center • Springfield, Massachusetts (Quarterfinal Game 2)	FloHockey	Fiske	L 3–4	264	18–13–7
March 5	1:05 pm	Holy Cross*		MassMutual Center • Springfield, Massachusetts (Quarterfinal Game 3)	FloHockey	Fiske	L 3–4	297	18–14–7
*Non-conference game. ^{#}Rankings from USCHO.com Poll. All times are in Eastern Time. Source:

== Scoring statistics ==
Name	Position	Games	Goals	Assists	Points	PIM
Blake Bennett	F	38	22	13	35	35
Jordan Biro	F	38	11	20	31	2
Dustin Manz	F	39	10	14	24	17
Brian Kramer	D	35	6	17	23	38
Nicholas Cardelli	F	31	11	11	22	12
Julius Janhonen	F	38	8	14	22	24
Alexander Malinowski	F	34	7	13	20	8
Brett Rylance	F	33	8	11	19	8
Brett Callahan	D	35	2	16	18	10
Matt Rickard	D	33	2	15	17	10
Oscar Geschwind	F	35	8	8	16	6
Evan Stella	D	39	2	13	15	35
Timofei Khokhlachev	F	35	7	5	12	22
Josh Barnes	F	21	5	4	9	6
Aaron Grounds	F	31	4	5	9	19
Casey McDonald	F	18	5	3	8	10
Austen Long	F	35	3	5	8	43
Luis Lindner	D	35	0	7	7	10
Eric Otto	F	18	2	2	4	4
Nico Somerville	F	30	0	3	3	18
Jarrett Fiske	G	26	0	2	2	0
Andrew Amousse	F	6	1	0	1	0
John Lundy	F	9	0	1	1	2
Reggie Millette	F	13	0	1	1	10
Zach Purcell	F	3	0	0	0	2
Brennan Boynton	G	3	0	0	0	0
Grayson Dietrich	F	4	0	0	0	2
Casper Soderling	D	4	0	0	0	2
Troy Kobryn	G	9	0	0	0	0
Alexandros Aslanidis	G	16	0	0	0	0
Darwin Lakoduk	F	25	0	0	0	2
Jake Rosenbaum	D	26	0	0	0	2
Total			124	203	327	369

== Goaltending statistics ==
Name	Games	Minutes	Wins	Losses	Ties	Goals against	Saves	Shut outs	SV %	GAA
Alexandros Aslanidis	16	728:03	8	3	1	26	311	2	.923	2.14
Jarrett Fiske	26	1435:04	10	8	6	57	682	2	.923	2.38
Troy Kobryn	9	193:39	0	3	0	9	78	0	.897	2.79
Brennan Boynton	3	20:00	0	0	0	1	8	0	.889	3.00
Empty Net	-	22:38	-	-	-	5	-	-	-	-
Total	39	2399:24	18	14	7	98	1079	4	.917	2.45

== Rankings ==
Poll	Week																											
Poll	Pre	1	2	3	4	5	6	7	8	9	10	11	12	13	14	15	16	17	18	19	20	21	22	23	24	25	26	27 (Final)
USCHO.com	NR	-	NR	NR	NR	NR	NR	NR	NR	NR	NR	NR	NR	-	NR	NR	NR	NR	NR	NR	NR	NR	NR	NR	NR	NR	-	NR
USA Today	NR	NR	NR	NR	NR	NR	NR	NR	NR	NR	NR	NR	NR	NR	NR	NR	NR	NR	NR	NR	NR	NR	NR	NR	NR	NR	NR	NR

Note: USCHO did not release a poll in weeks 1, 13, or 26.

== Awards and honors ==
Player	Award	Ref
Jarrett Fiske	Atlantic Hockey Regular Season Goaltending Award	
Blake Bennett	Atlantic Hockey First Team	
Jarrett Fiske	Atlantic Hockey Second Team	
Brian Kramer	Atlantic Hockey Second Team	
Jordan Biro	Atlantic Hockey Third Team	
