= Cunniff =

Cunniff is a surname. Notable people with the surname include:

- Brandon Cunniff (born 1988), American baseball player
- David Cunniff (born 1970), American ice hockey player
- Jill Cunniff (born 1966), American musician
- John Cunniff (1944–2002), American ice hockey coach
- M. G. Cunniff (1875–1914), American politician

== See also ==
- Cunniffe
