= 2022–23 Canisius Golden Griffins men's ice hockey season =

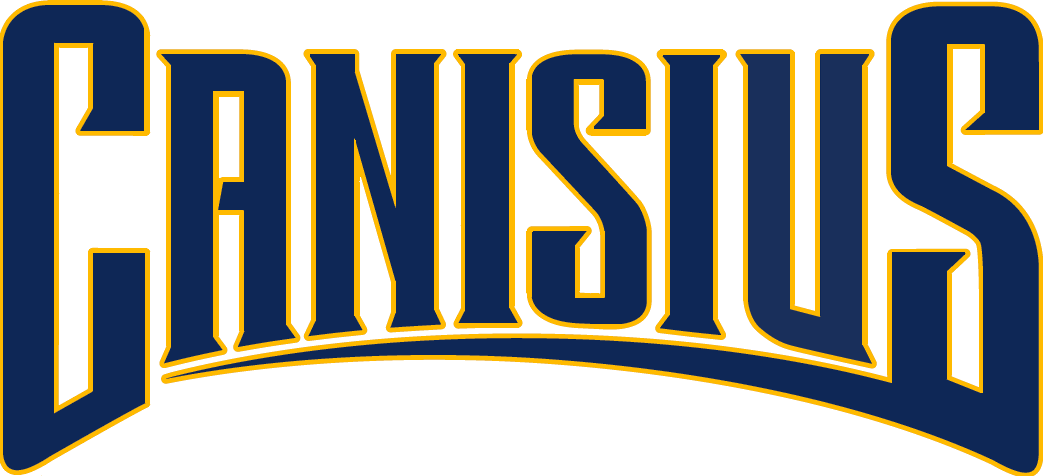

Atlantic Hockey tournament, champion NCAA tournament, Regional semifinal
- Conference: 4th Atlantic Hockey
- Home ice: LECOM Harborcenter

Rankings
- USCHO: NR
- USA Today: NR

Record
- Overall: 20–19–3
- Conference: 13–10–3
- Home: 10–10–2
- Road: 10–8–1
- Neutral: 0–1–0

Coaches and captains
- Head coach: Trevor Large
- Assistant coaches: Daniel Paille; Max Mobley
- Captain: J. D. Pogue
- Alternate captain(s): Keaton Mastrodonato; David Melaragni

The 2022–23 Canisius Golden Griffins men's ice hockey season was the 43rd season of play for the program, the 25th at the Division I level, and the 20th in the Atlantic Hockey conference. The Golden Griffins represented Canisius College and were coached by Trevor Large, in his 6th season.

== Season ==
Canisius got off to a slow start, only winning two of their first 10 games. Neither the team's primary starter, Jacob Barczewski, nor the backup, John Hawthorne played particularly well but they were not receiving much help from the defense. Early in the season, Canisius was routinely getting outshot in their games by allowing the opposition to assail their cage. To make matters worse, the offense failed to capitalize in several games where the goaltenders turned in decent performances. The Griffins did not seem to shake out of their funk until November when they swept a series from defending league champion American International.

In early December, the team got a surprise victory by taking down league-leading RIT in overtime. The rematch showed that the team still had a ways to go as Canisius was swamped 4–10 by the Tigers. Due to the closure of the Buffalo airport, caused by heavy snowfall, the series with Air Force on December 30–31 was postponed. It was later rescheduled for February 13 and 14 and, as a result, the series with Sacred Heart was pushed back a day to February 18–19.

The Griffins kept plugging away and got stronger on both offense and defense as the season went along. The team pulled itself up into the top half of league standings with a strong finish. After another split with RIT, Canisius went 6–2 over the final four weeks to reach 4th in the Atlantic Hockey standings, earning themselves a home site for the quarterfinals.

Against Army, the Griffins continued the trend of allowing a bevy of chances. The Black Knights fired 37 chances on goal to 27 for Canisius; however, Barczewski was strong in net and only allowed two to get past him. A 5-goal output from the offense was more than enough to give the Golden Griffins a leg up in the series; however, the scoring flagged in the rematch. Canisius was badly outshot and wasted a masterful performance in goal when Barczewski stopped the first 34 chances that came his way. Army scored on their 35th attempt; it came in overtime and tied the series at 1-all. With their season on the line, Canisius fought back in the rubber match and finished with the shot advantage. Barczewski again allowed nothing past him in regulation and, since he got some goal support this time, helped finish off Army with his second shutout of the season.

Canisius faced a scrappy Niagara club that punched above its record in the semifinals. The Griffs offense was a bit sluggish and could only manage a single goal, leading to a 1–2 defeat. Ordinarily, that would have been the end of Canisius' season; however, Atlantic Hockey had changed the playoff format for this season and turned the semifinal round into a best-of-three series. With Barczewski remaining a rock in goal, the offense returned for the rest of the series and the trio of Keaton Mastrodonato, Ryan Miotto and David Melaragni combined for 10 points to lead Canisius to their second title game in three seasons.

Only Holy Cross stood in the way of the Griffins second trip to the NCAA tournament and the team could not have asked for a better performance by the defense. Canisius allowed just 24 shots from the Crusaders and Barczewski stopped them all. A second-period goal from Nick Bowman was all the offense the team needed and two empty-net marker sealed the game, sending the Golden Griffins to the tournament.

As the team with the lowest ranking, Canisius was given the 16th and final seed for the tournament. As a result, they were set to play the nation's top team, Minnesota. Knowing that they needed to play a near-perfect game if they had a chance at upsetting the vaunted Gophers, Canisius played well at the start of the game. While they took a penalty in the first 5 minutes and allowed a Minnesota power play goal, the Griffins tied the game just 3 minutes later to make sure that they kept contact with the Gophers. Early in the second period, Nick Bowman gave the Griffins the lead on a highlight-reel goal. Canisius continued to play well but could not stop the Minnesota offense from scoring twice before the end of the period. As they entered the third Canisius was just a shot away from tying the game. While they had also been outshout, it was a relatively small gap of just 15–19. The Griffins were well positioned for a potential upset but they would have to continue to play the Gophers tough over the final 20 minutes. Freshman Stefano Bottini got a bit too reckless and, when he went to hit Jackson LaCombe in the corner, left his feet and hit the Gopher defenseman in the head. Bottini received a match penalty and handed the Gophers a 5-minute power play. It took less than a minute for Minnesota to make Canisius pay and they ended up scoring twice on the man-advantage. With the game now getting away from them, Canisius had to abandon any real defensive system they had and try to score three goals in the final 15 minutes. However, all that did was allowed the highly talented Gophers to pour on an avalanche of goals and bury the Griffins. Minnesota scored a further 4 goals, ending the game with 8 unanswered markers to walk away with a win.

== Departures ==
Player	Position	Nationality	Cause
Austin Alger	Forward	United States	Graduation (signed with Idaho Steelheads)
Alex Ambrosio	Forward	Canada	Graduation (signed with Corsaires de Nantes)
Derek Hamelin	Defenseman	Canada	Graduate transfer to Alaska Anchorage
Matt Ladd	Goaltender	United States	Graduate transfer to Lindenwood
Lee Lapid	Forward	Canada	Graduation (signed with Cincinnati Cyclones)
Mitchell Martan	Forward	Canada	Graduate transfer to Bemidji State
Joey Matthews	Defenseman	United States	Graduation (signed with Greenville Swamp Rabbits)
Nick Parody	Defenseman	United States	Left program (retired)
Niclas Puikkonen	Forward	Sweden	Left program (retired)
Cory Thomas	Defenseman	Canada	Graduation (signed with Idaho Steelheads)
Jake Witkowski	Forward	United States	Graduation (retired)
Connor Zilisch	Forward	United States	Left program (retired)

== Recruiting ==
Player	Position	Nationality	Age	Notes
Hunter Andrew	Forward	Canada	19	Virden, MB
Markus Boguslavsky	Forward	Canada	23	Calgary, AB; transfer from Boston University
Stefano Bottini	Forward	Switzerland	20	Lugano, SUI
Nick Bowman	Forward	United States	24	Shelby Township, MI; graduate transfer from Rensselaer
Tyrell Buckley	Defenseman	Canada	25	Penticton, BC; graduate transfer from Michigan Tech
Brenden Datema	Defenseman	United States	23	Sterling Heights, MI; transfer from Michigan Tech
Grant Loven	Forward	United States	24	East Grand Forks, MN; graduate transfer from St. Thomas
Christian MacDougall	Forward	Canada	21	Toronto, ON
Cody Schiavon	Forward	Canada	22	West Kelowna, BC; transfer from Vermont
Oliver Tarr	Forward	Canada	20	Uxbridge, ON
Erik Urbank	Forward	United States	23	Orchard Park, NY; graduate transfer from Dartmouth

== Roster ==
As of August 1, 2022

No.	Nat.	Player	Class	Pos	Height	Weight	DoB	Hometown	Previous team	NHL rights
4	(United States)	Keegan Langefels	Sophomore	D	6' 0" (1.83 m)	185 lb (84 kg)	2001-02-02	Eden Prairie, Minnesota	New Mexico Ice Wolves (NAHL)	—
5	(United States)	David Melaragni (A)	Senior	D	6' 0" (1.83 m)	180 lb (82 kg)	1998-03-30	Philadelphia, Pennsylvania	Cowichan Valley Capitals (BCHL)	—
8	(Canada)	Keaton Mastrodonato (A)	Senior	F	6' 0" (1.83 m)	205 lb (93 kg)	2000-09-24	Powell River, British Columbia	Alberni Valley Bulldogs (BCHL)	—
9	(Canada)	J. D. Pogue (C)	Graduate	F	6' 1" (1.85 m)	195 lb (88 kg)	1997-06-23	Montreal, Quebec	Cornwall Colts (CCHL)	—
12	(United States)	Grant Loven	Graduate	F	5' 11" (1.8 m)	190 lb (86 kg)	1997-12-21	East Grand Forks, Minnesota	St. Thomas (CCHA)	—
13	(United States)	Nick Bowman	Graduate	F	6' 0" (1.83 m)	200 lb (91 kg)	1997-12-19	Shelby, Michigan	RPI (ECAC)	—
14	(United States)	Daniel DiGrande	Senior	F	5' 10" (1.78 m)	180 lb (82 kg)	1997-08-05	Macomb, Michigan	RPI (ECAC)	—
15	(Canada)	Markus Boguslavsky	Senior	F	6' 1" (1.85 m)	190 lb (86 kg)	1999-05-15	Calgary, Alberta	Boston University (HEA)	—
20	(United States)	Randy Hernandez	Junior	F	6' 0" (1.83 m)	190 lb (86 kg)	1999-01-12	Miami, Florida	Robert Morris (AHA)	—
23	(United States)	Cooper Haar	Junior	F	6' 3" (1.91 m)	205 lb (93 kg)	1999-04-26	Huntington Beach, California	Aberdeen Wings (NAHL)	—
24	(United States)	Jackson Decker	Junior	D	5' 11" (1.8 m)	170 lb (77 kg)	1999-03-19	Algonquin, Illinois	Chippewa Steel (NAHL)	—
25	(Canada)	Matt Vermaeten	Sophomore	F	5' 10" (1.78 m)	165 lb (75 kg)	2001-01-04	Ottawa, Ontario	Shreveport Mudbugs (NAHL)	—
26	(Switzerland)	Stefano Bottini	Freshman	F	6' 0" (1.83 m)	180 lb (82 kg)	2002-05-03	Lugano, Switzerland	Penticton Vees (BCHL)	—
27	(Canada)	Ryan Miotto	Senior	F	6' 0" (1.83 m)	185 lb (84 kg)	1999-07-11	Thorold, Ontario	Alberni Valley Bulldogs (BCHL)	—
29	(Canada)	John Hawthorne	Senior	G	6' 2" (1.88 m)	190 lb (86 kg)	1998-09-02	Chemainus, British Columbia	Northern Michigan (WCHA)	—
30	(United States)	Jacob Barczewski	Senior	G	6' 1" (1.85 m)	175 lb (79 kg)	1999-01-07	O'Fallon, Missouri	Tri-City Storm (USHL)	—
37	(Canada)	Hunter Andrew	Freshman	F	6' 0" (1.83 m)	165 lb (75 kg)	2002-10-25	Virden, Manitoba	Powell River Kings (BCHL)	—
47	(Canada)	Tyrell Buckley	Graduate	D	6' 0" (1.83 m)	200 lb (91 kg)	1997-03-01	Penticton, British Columbia	Michigan Tech (CCHA)	—
53	(United States)	Lincoln Erne	Senior	D	6' 0" (1.83 m)	200 lb (91 kg)	1998-09-26	Blaine, Minnesota	Minot Minotauros (NAHL)	—
55	(Canada)	Christian MacDougall	Freshman	F	6' 0" (1.83 m)	180 lb (82 kg)	2001-03-13	Toronto, Ontario	Coquitlam Express (BCHL)	—
57	(United States)	Brenden Datema	Senior	D	6' 5" (1.96 m)	220 lb (100 kg)	1999-03-18	Sterling Heights, Michigan	Michigan Tech (CCHA)	—
61	(United States)	Erik Urbank	Graduate	F	6' 2" (1.88 m)	195 lb (88 kg)	1999-03-28	Orchard Park, New York	Dartmouth (ECAC)	—
72	(United States)	Max Kouznetsov	Junior	F	5' 11" (1.8 m)	175 lb (79 kg)	2000-12-06	Voorhees, New Jersey	Johnstown Tomahawks (NAHL)	—
73	(Canada)	Cody Schiavon	Junior	D	6' 0" (1.83 m)	200 lb (91 kg)	2000-07-01	West Kelowna, British Columbia	Vermont (HEA)	—
77	(Canada)	Jack Lyons	Junior	D	6' 1" (1.85 m)	205 lb (93 kg)	1999-07-04	Mississauga, Ontario	Oakville Blades (OJHL)	—
85	(United States)	Alex Houston	Sophomore	G	6' 2" (1.88 m)	190 lb (86 kg)	2002-03-21	Canton, Ohio	Cornwall Colts (CCHL)	—
89	(Canada)	Simon Gravel	Senior	F	5' 10" (1.78 m)	185 lb (84 kg)	1999-04-10	Boucherville, Quebec	Brooks Bandits (AJHL)	—
91	(Canada)	Alton McDermott	Sophomore	F	5' 10" (1.78 m)	170 lb (77 kg)	2001-06-04	Oakville, Ontario	Oakville Blades (OJHL)	—
92	(Canada)	Oliver Tarr	Freshman	F	6' 0" (1.83 m)	170 lb (77 kg)	2002-01-20	Uxbridge, Ontario	Haliburton County Huskies (OJHL)	—
94	(Canada)	Hudson Lambert	Senior	D	6' 0" (1.83 m)	190 lb (86 kg)	1998-08-17	Richmond Hill, Ontario	Brampton Admirals (OJHL)	—

== Standings ==
2022–23 Atlantic Hockey Standings
	Conference record										Overall record					
	GP	W	L	T	OW	OL	SW	PTS	GF	GA	GP	W	L	T	GF	GA
RIT †	26	18	7	1	1	3	0	57	85	55	39	25	13	1	127	100
American International	26	14	8	4	2	0	3	47	87	62	39	18	14	7	124	98
Sacred Heart	26	14	9	3	2	0	2	45	87	72	37	17	17	3	107	112
Canisius *	26	13	10	3	3	1	1	41	76	71	42	20	19	3	118	119
Army	26	12	12	2	3	3	1	39	72	81	37	14	19	4	98	119
Niagara	26	10	13	3	0	3	2	38	73	86	40	19	18	3	119	129
Holy Cross	26	12	12	2	3	1	1	37	73	71	41	17	21	3	98	119
Mercyhurst	26	9	14	3	1	5	1	35	77	80	36	10	23	3	98	122
Bentley	26	8	16	2	1	1	1	27	61	89	34	11	21	2	81	124
Air Force	26	8	17	1	1	0	0	24	63	87	36	12	22	2	95	128
Championship: March 18, 2023 † indicates conference regular season champion (DeGregorio Trophy) * indicates conference tournament champion (Riley Trophy); Rankings: USCHO.com Top 20 Poll

== Schedule and results ==
Date	Time	Opponent^{#}	Rank^{#}	Site	TV	Decision	Result	Attendance	Record
Regular season
October 7	7:00 p.m.	at Penn State*		Pegula Ice Arena • University Park, Pennsylvania	BTN+	Barczewski	L 2–5	6,182	0–1–0
October 8	6:00 p.m.	at Penn State*		Pegula Ice Arena • University Park, Pennsylvania	BTN+	Hawthorne	L 5–7	6,343	0–2–0
October 14	7:00 p.m.	at Ferris State*		Ewigleben Arena • Big Rapids, Michigan	FloHockey	Hawthorne	W 5–3	1,643	1–2–0
October 15	7:00 p.m.	at Ferris State*		Ewigleben Arena • Big Rapids, Michigan	FloHockey	Barczewski	L 1–4	1,656	1–3–0
October 18	7:00 p.m.	Rensselaer*		LECOM Harborcenter • Buffalo, New York	FloHockey	Hawthorne	W 3–2	647	2–3–0
October 21	7:00 p.m.	Miami*		LECOM Harborcenter • Buffalo, New York	FloHockey	Hawthorne	L 3–5	973	2–4–0
October 22	4:00 p.m.	Miami*		LECOM Harborcenter • Buffalo, New York	FloHockey	Barczewski	L 0–2	657	2–5–0
October 28	7:00 p.m.	at Sacred Heart		Total Mortgage Arena • Bridgeport, Connecticut	FloHockey	Barczewski	L 3–6	754	2–6–0 (0–1–0)
October 29	4:00 p.m.	at Sacred Heart		Total Mortgage Arena • Bridgeport, Connecticut	FloHockey	Barczewski	L 1–3	584	2–7–0 (0–2–0)
November 4	7:00 p.m.	Holy Cross		LECOM Harborcenter • Buffalo, New York	FloHockey	Barczewski	L 1–3	707	2–8–0 (0–3–0)
November 5	4:00 p.m.	Holy Cross		LECOM Harborcenter • Buffalo, New York	FloHockey	Hawthorne	T 2–2 ^{SOL}	919	2–8–1 (0–3–1)
November 11	7:00 p.m.	American International		LECOM Harborcenter • Buffalo, New York	FloHockey	Barczewski	W 5–2	605	3–8–1 (1–3–1)
November 12	3:00 p.m.	American International		LECOM Harborcenter • Buffalo, New York	FloHockey	Barczewski	W 3–2	603	4–8–1 (2–3–1)
November 25	1:00 p.m.	Army		LECOM Harborcenter • Buffalo, New York	FloHockey	Hawthorne	T 2–2 ^{SOW}	589	4–8–2 (2–3–2)
November 26	1:00 p.m.	Army		LECOM Harborcenter • Buffalo, New York	FloHockey	Hawthorne	L 1–3	627	4–9–2 (2–4–2)
December 2	7:00 p.m.	at RIT		Gene Polisseni Center • Henrietta, New York	FloHockey	Barczewski	W 2–1 ^{OT}	2,628	5–9–2 (3–4–2)
December 3	7:05 p.m.	RIT		LECOM Harborcenter • Buffalo, New York	FloHockey	Barczewski	L 4–10	–	5–10–2 (3–5–2)
December 10	2:00 p.m.	at Maine*		Alfond Arena • Orono, Maine	ESPN+	Barczewski	L 0–3	3,333	5–11–2
January 13	7:00 p.m.	at Army		Tate Rink • West Point, New York	FloHockey	Barczewski	L 0–2	1,769	5–12–2 (3–6–2)
January 14	4:00 p.m.	at Army		Tate Rink • West Point, New York	FloHockey	Barczewski	W 5–4	1,564	6–12–2 (4–6–2)
January 20	7:00 p.m.	at Bentley		Bentley Arena • Waltham, Massachusetts	FloHockey	Barczewski	W 5–1	1,450	7–12–2 (5–6–2)
January 21	4:00 p.m.	at Bentley		Bentley Arena • Waltham, Massachusetts	FloHockey	Barczewski	T 2–2 ^{SOL}	1,300	7–12–3 (5–6–3)
January 27	7:00 p.m.	Niagara		LECOM Harborcenter • Buffalo, New York	FloHockey	Barczewski	W 5–2	1,236	8–12–3 (6–6–3)
January 28	7:00 p.m.	Niagara		LECOM Harborcenter • Buffalo, New York	FloHockey	Barczewski	L 2–5	1,121	8–13–3 (6–7–3)
February 3	7:05 p.m.	#18 RIT		LECOM Harborcenter • Buffalo, New York	FloHockey	Barczewski	L 2–3	785	8–14–3 (6–8–3)
February 4	7:00 p.m.	at #18 RIT		Gene Polisseni Center • Henrietta, New York	FloHockey	Barczewski	W 3–2 ^{OT}	3,252	9–14–3 (7–8–3)
February 10	7:00 p.m.	at Mercyhurst		Mercyhurst Ice Center • Erie, Pennsylvania	FloHockey	Barczewski	W 4–3	-	10–14–3 (8–8–3)
February 11	4:00 p.m.	at Mercyhurst		Mercyhurst Ice Center • Erie, Pennsylvania	FloHockey	Hawthorne	W 2–0	473	11–14–3 (9–8–3)
February 13	9:00 p.m.	at Air Force		Cadet Ice Arena • Colorado Springs, Colorado	Altitude 2	Barczewski	L 1–2	1,067	11–15–3 (9–9–3)
February 14	9:00 p.m.	at Air Force		Cadet Ice Arena • Colorado Springs, Colorado	Altitude 2	Hawthorne	W 4–1	962	12–15–3 (10–9–3)
February 18	7:00 p.m.	Sacred Heart		LECOM Harborcenter • Buffalo, New York	FloHockey	Barczewski	W 6–4	973	13–15–3 (11–9–3)
February 19	4:00 p.m.	Sacred Heart		LECOM Harborcenter • Buffalo, New York	FloHockey	Hawthorne	L 2–3 ^{OT}	813	13–16–3 (11–10–3)
February 24	7:00 p.m.	at Holy Cross		Hart Center • Worcester, Massachusetts	FloHockey	Barczewski	W 3–0	576	14–16–3 (12–10–3)
February 25	7:00 p.m.	at Holy Cross		Hart Center • Worcester, Massachusetts	FloHockey	Hawthorne	W 6–3	304	15–16–3 (13–10–3)
Atlantic Hockey tournament
March 3	7:00 p.m.	Army*		LECOM Harborcenter • Buffalo, New York (Quarterfinal Game 1)	FloHockey	Barczewski	W 5–2	231	16–16–3
March 4	7:30 p.m.	Army*		LECOM Harborcenter • Buffalo, New York (Quarterfinal Game 2)	FloHockey	Barczewski	L 0–1 ^{OT}	361	16–17–3
March 5	5:00 p.m.	Army*		LECOM Harborcenter • Buffalo, New York (Quarterfinal Game 3)	FloHockey	Barczewski	W 3–0	216	17–17–3
March 10	6:05 p.m.	Niagara*		LECOM Harborcenter • Buffalo, New York (Semifinal Game 1)	FloHockey	Barczewski	L 1–2	546	17–18–3
March 11	7:35 p.m.	Niagara*		LECOM Harborcenter • Buffalo, New York (Semifinal Game 2)	FloHockey	Barczewski	W 5–1	500	18–18–3
March 12	7:05 p.m.	Niagara*		LECOM Harborcenter • Buffalo, New York (Semifinal Game 3)	FloHockey	Barczewski	W 4–2	457	19–18–3
March 18	7:05 p.m.	Holy Cross*		LECOM Harborcenter • Buffalo, New York (Championship)	FloHockey	Barczewski	W 3–0	1,805	20–18–3
NCAA tournament
March 23	8:00 p.m.	vs. #1 Minnesota*		Scheels Arena • Fargo, North Dakota (West Regional Semifinal)	ESPN2	Barczewski	L 2–9	5,061	20–19–3
*Non-conference game. ^{#}Rankings from USCHO.com Poll. All times are in Eastern Time. Source:

== Scoring statistics ==
Name	Position	Games	Goals	Assists	Points	PIM
Keaton Mastrodonato	C	42	16	20	36	30
Ryan Miotto	F	42	17	18	35	29
David Melaragni	D	41	4	21	25	24
Randy Hernández	RW	40	8	13	21	6
Nick Bowman	F	35	11	9	20	27
Jackson Decker	D	41	3	17	20	14
Max Kouznetsov	C/LW	42	6	12	18	25
Danny DiGrande	C	27	12	4	16	27
Erik Urbank	RW	34	6	9	15	20
Simon Gravel	C/RW	31	5	8	13	9
Grant Loven	C	32	3	9	12	18
Alton McDermott	RW	27	7	4	11	10
J. D. Pogue	LW	32	4	7	11	64
Markus Boguslavsky	C/RW	37	4	7	11	41
Brenden Datema	D	30	1	9	10	35
Stefano Bottini	LW/RW	32	4	4	8	55
Hudson Lambert	D	35	2	6	8	13
Cody Schiavon	D	26	1	6	7	14
Tyrell Buckley	D	38	1	5	6	10
Lincoln Erne	D	41	1	4	5	36
Hunter Andrew	F	15	1	2	3	10
Matt Vermaeten	F	22	0	3	3	4
Oliver Tarr	RW	13	1	1	2	4
Cooper Haar	LW	4	0	2	2	4
Keegan Langefels	D	12	0	1	1	4
Jack Lyons	D	20	0	1	1	2
Jacob Barczewski	G	32	0	1	1	0
Alex Houston	G	2	0	0	0	0
Christian MacDougall	F	3	0	0	0	4
John Hawthorne	G	13	0	0	0	0
Total			118	204	322	539

== Goaltending statistics ==
Name	Games	Minutes	Wins	Losses	Ties	Goals against	Saves	Shut-outs	SV %	GAA
Alex Houston	1	0:06	0	0	0	0	0	0	-	0.00
Jacob Barczewski	32	1882:42	16	15	1	83	934	3	.918	2.65
John Hawthorne	13	655:10	4	4	2	29	300	1	.912	2.65
Empty Net	-	18:16	-	-	-	7	-	-	-	-
Total	42	2556:14	20	19	3	119	1234	4	.912	2.79

== Rankings ==
Poll	Week																											
Poll	Pre	1	2	3	4	5	6	7	8	9	10	11	12	13	14	15	16	17	18	19	20	21	22	23	24	25	26	27 (Final)
USCHO.com	NR	-	NR	NR	NR	NR	NR	NR	NR	NR	NR	NR	NR	-	NR	NR	NR	NR	NR	NR	NR	NR	NR	NR	NR	NR	-	NR
USA Today	NR	NR	NR	NR	NR	NR	NR	NR	NR	NR	NR	NR	NR	NR	NR	NR	NR	NR	NR	NR	NR	NR	NR	NR	NR	NR	NR	NR

Note: USCHO did not release a poll in weeks 1, 13, or 26.

== Awards and honors ==
Player	Award	Ref
Jacob Barczewski	Atlantic Hockey Most Valuable Player in Tournament	
Jacob Barczewski	Atlantic Hockey Third Team	
Keaton Mastrodonato	Atlantic Hockey Third Team	
Jacob Barczewski	Atlantic Hockey All-Tournament Team	
Jackson Decker	Atlantic Hockey All-Tournament Team	
Keaton Mastrodonato	Atlantic Hockey All-Tournament Team	
Nick Bowman	Atlantic Hockey All-Tournament Team	
