= 2022–23 Mercyhurst Lakers men's ice hockey season =

- Conference: 8th Atlantic Hockey
- Home ice: Mercyhurst Ice Center

Rankings
- USCHO: NR
- USA Today: NR

Record
- Overall: 10–23–3
- Conference: 9–14–3
- Home: 6–10–1
- Road: 4–13–2

Coaches and captains
- Head coach: Rick Gotkin
- Assistant coaches: Greg Gardner; Tom Peffall; Ryan Zapolski
- Captain(s): Joseph Maziarz; Rylee St. Onge
- Alternate captain(s): Owen Norton; Cade Townend

The 2022–23 Mercyhurst Lakers men's ice hockey season was the 36th season of play for the program, the 24th at the Division I level, and the 20th in the Atlantic Hockey conference. The Lakers represented Mercyhurst University and were coached by Rick Gotkin, in his 35th season.

== Season ==
Entering the year, Mercyhurst was seeing to continue its upwards swing but would have to first find a replacement for departed starting goaltender, Kyle McClellan. Graduate transfer Tyler Harmon eventually won the job to start the season but didn't keep the job for long. After just three games the two underclassmen, Owen Say and Matt Lenz, began seeing time in goal. Unfortunately, the change in goal didn't seem to provide any benefits for the Lakers. Mercyhurst began the year by losing each of its first six games and winning just once in its first twelve.

While the team was allowing an average of 4.5 goals against per game, the goaltending didn't appear to be the problem. Over the course of the season, the defense allowed all three of the team's goaltenders to come under a heavy barrage, allowing an average of nearly 37 shots against per game. In spite of those withering attempts, The team did show some life beginning in November. Once Harmon and Say began sharing the goal, Mercyhurst put together a 5-game winning streak and shot up into the top half of the conference standings.

Early December found the team's lack of offense begin to show and the Lakers went on an extended losing stretch. Over a more than three-month period, Mercyhurst went 2–11–1 and ended up near the bottom of the standings. During that time the team was able to score more than 3 goals on just 3 occasions, coincidentally, those were the only game that it did not lose. With on Eric Esposito showing any real offensive punch, the forwards were unable to provide enough scoring to offset the porous defense. Early January also saw the team abandon its goaltending rotation and stick with Harmon as the team's starter.

Mercyhurst ended the regular season 8th in Atlantic Hockey, just enough for them to receive the final berth into the conference tournament. Despite facing the bet team in the conference in the Quarterfinals, Mercyhurst was able to get a lead in both games. Unfortunately, as it had all season, the Laker's defense wasn't able to hold off the attack from RIT and allowed 96 shots in the two games. The Tigers scored the final three goals on both nights, sweeping the series and ending Mercyhurst's season.

Shortly after the end of the season, Carson Brière was charged with criminal mischief and disorderly conduct stemming from an incident where he took a double amputee's empty wheelchair and pushed it down a flight of stairs while at a local bar. Patrick Carrozzi, a member of the school's lacrosse team, was also charged.

== Departures ==
Player	Position	Nationality	Cause
Michael Bevilacqua	Forward	United States	Graduation (retired)
Pierce Crawford	Forward	United States	Graduation (retired)
Devon Daniels	Defenseman	Canada	Graduation (signed with Dundee Stars)
Wyatt Head	Defenseman	Canada	Left program (retired)
Austin Heidemann	Forward	United States	Transferred to Rensselaer
Steven Ipri	Forward	United States	Graduation (signed with Wichita Thunder)
Henry Johnson	Goaltender	United States	Graduation (signed with Macon Mayhem)
Noah Kane	Forward	United States	Transferred to Long Island
Geoff Kitt	Forward	Canada	Graduation (signed with Kansas City Mavericks)
Josh McDougall	Defenseman	Canada	Graduation (signed with Wichita Thunder)
Kyle McClellan	Goaltender	United States	Transferred to Wisconsin
Dante Sheriff	Forward	Canada	Left program

== Recruiting ==
Player	Position	Nationality	Age	Notes
Steven Agriogianis	Forward	United States	23	East Hanover, NJ; transfer from Northeastern
Tommy Bannister	Forward	United States	21	Clayton, NY
Adrien Bisson	Defenseman	Canada	23	Cornwall, ON; transfer from Maine
Ryan Coughlin	Forward	United States	21	Charlotte, NC
Eric Esposito	Forward	United States	24	West Haven, CT; graduate transfer from New Hampshire
Tyler Gaulin	Forward	United States	20	Kingston, NH
Tyler Harmon	Goaltender	United States	24	Jonesville, MI; graduate transfer from Vermont
Nicholas Kent	Defenseman	United States	21	Ladera Ranch, CA
Brendon Michaelian	Defenseman	United States	24	Wixom, MI; graduate transfer from Ferris State
Tyler Nasca	Defenseman	United States	21	Wheatfield, NY
Owen Say	Goaltender	Canada	21	London, ON

== Roster ==
As of August 16, 2022.

No.	Nat.	Player	Class	Pos	Height	Weight	DoB	Hometown	Previous team	NHL rights
1	(United States)	Matt Lenz	Sophomore	G	5' 11" (1.8 m)	170 lb (77 kg)	1999-06-02	Grapevine, Texas	Steinbach Pistons (MJHL)	—
2	(United States)	Philip Waugh	Junior	F	6' 4" (1.93 m)	217 lb (98 kg)	2000-01-10	McLean, Virginia	P.A.L. Jr. Islanders (NCDC)	—
3	(United States)	Jake Beaune	Sophomore	D	6' 3" (1.91 m)	195 lb (88 kg)	2000-06-13	Livonia, Michigan	Lincoln Stars (USHL)	—
4	(Canada)	Cade Townend (A)	Senior	D	6' 1" (1.85 m)	200 lb (91 kg)	1999-06-17	Carleton Place, Ontario	Carleton Place Canadians (CCHL)	—
5	(United States)	Brendon Michaelian	Graduate	D	6' 0" (1.83 m)	185 lb (84 kg)	1997-12-07	Wixom, Michigan	Ferris State (CCHA)	—
6	(United States)	Carson Brière	Junior	F	5' 9" (1.75 m)	165 lb (75 kg)	1999-09-23	Philadelphia, Pennsylvania	Trail Smoke Eaters (BCHL)	—
7	(United States)	Eric Esposito	Graduate	F	5' 11" (1.8 m)	188 lb (85 kg)	1998-08-24	West Haven, Connecticut	New Hampshire (HEA)	—
8	(Canada)	Owen Norton (A)	Graduate	D	5' 10" (1.78 m)	170 lb (77 kg)	1998-06-19	Ancaster, Ontario	Surrey Eagles (BCHL)	—
9	(United States)	Tyler Gaulin	Freshman	F	6' 0" (1.83 m)	178 lb (81 kg)	2001-11-09	Kingston, New Hampshire	Maine Nordiques (NAHL)	—
10	(United States)	Steven Agriogianis	Junior	F	5' 9" (1.75 m)	175 lb (79 kg)	1999-01-07	East Hanover, New Jersey	Northeastern (HEA)	—
12	(United States)	Dustin Geregach	Sophomore	D	6' 0" (1.83 m)	181 lb (82 kg)	2001-11-14	McKees Rocks, Pennsylvania	Johnstown Tomahawks (NAHL)	—
13	(United States)	Paul Maust	Senior	F	5' 10" (1.78 m)	170 lb (77 kg)	1998-06-24	Butler, Pennsylvania	Green Bay Gamblers (USHL)	—
14	(United States)	Gueorgui Feduolov	Senior	F	5' 9" (1.75 m)	195 lb (88 kg)	1998-12-10	Mentor, Ohio	Shreveport Mudbugs (NAHL)	—
15	(United States)	Tommy Bannister	Freshman	F	5' 9" (1.75 m)	180 lb (82 kg)	2001-09-05	Clayton, New York	New Jersey Titans (NAHL)	—
16	(United States)	Ryan Coughlin	Freshman	F	6' 0" (1.83 m)	180 lb (82 kg)	2001-02-09	Charlotte, North Carolina	New Jersey Titans (NAHL)	—
18	(United States)	Dalton Hunter	Graduate	F	6' 3" (1.91 m)	210 lb (95 kg)	1997-09-26	Greensburg, Pennsylvania	Dubuque Fighting Saints (USHL)	—
19	(United States)	Garrett Dahm	Sophomore	F	6' 1" (1.85 m)	175 lb (79 kg)	2000-06-29	Belleville, Illinois	Youngstown Phantoms (USHL)	—
20	(Canada)	Keanan Stewart	Junior	F	6' 3" (1.91 m)	195 lb (88 kg)	2000-04-29	Elmira, Ontario	Burlington Cougars (OJHL)	—
21	(United States)	Mickey Burns	Junior	F	5' 9" (1.75 m)	175 lb (79 kg)	2000-04-03	Wayne, New Jersey	Vermont (HEA)	—
22	(United States)	Kyler Head	Junior	F	6' 4" (1.93 m)	215 lb (98 kg)	1999-07-13	Malone, New York	Robert Morris (AHA)	—
23	(United States)	Jonathan Bendorf	Senior	F	6' 0" (1.83 m)	180 lb (82 kg)	1999-02-26	Yardville, New Jersey	Aberdeen Wings (NAHL)	—
24	(United States)	Marko Reifenberger	Junior	F	6' 0" (1.83 m)	190 lb (86 kg)	1999-01-19	Hastings, Minnesota	Minnesota Magicians (NAHL)	—
25	(Canada)	Joseph Maziarz (C)	Senior	D	5' 11" (1.8 m)	190 lb (86 kg)	1999-02-23	Waterloo, Ontario	North York Rangers (OJHL)	—
26	(United States)	Nicholas Kent	Freshman	D	5' 10" (1.78 m)	190 lb (86 kg)	2001-02-01	Anaheim, California	Vernon Vipers (BCHL)	—
27	(United States)	Carver Watson	Senior	D	5' 11" (1.8 m)	175 lb (79 kg)	1998-03-03	Appleton, Wisconsin	Vernon Vipers (BCHL)	—
28	(United States)	Tyler Nasca	Freshman	D	5' 11" (1.8 m)	160 lb (73 kg)	2001-01-09	Buffalo, New York	Lone Star Brahmas (NAHL)	—
29	(Canada)	Adrien Bisson	Senior	D	6' 2" (1.88 m)	185 lb (84 kg)	1999-01-18	Cornwall, Ontario	Maine (HEA)	—
30	(United States)	Tyler Harmon	Graduate	G	6' 2" (1.88 m)	205 lb (93 kg)	1997-10-17	Jonesville, Michigan	Vermont (HEA)	—
31	(Canada)	Owen Say	Freshman	G	6' 2" (1.88 m)	175 lb (79 kg)	2001-06-05	London, Ontario	Salmon Arm Silverbacks (BCHL)	—
37	(Canada)	Rylee St. Onge (C)	Senior	F	5' 11" (1.8 m)	193 lb (88 kg)	1998-04-22	St. Catharines, Ontario	Alaska Anchorage (WCHA)	—

== Standings ==
2022–23 Atlantic Hockey Standings
	Conference record										Overall record					
	GP	W	L	T	OW	OL	SW	PTS	GF	GA	GP	W	L	T	GF	GA
RIT †	26	18	7	1	1	3	0	57	85	55	39	25	13	1	127	100
American International	26	14	8	4	2	0	3	47	87	62	39	18	14	7	124	98
Sacred Heart	26	14	9	3	2	0	2	45	87	72	37	17	17	3	107	112
Canisius *	26	13	10	3	3	1	1	41	76	71	42	20	19	3	118	119
Army	26	12	12	2	3	3	1	39	72	81	37	14	19	4	98	119
Niagara	26	10	13	3	0	3	2	38	73	86	40	19	18	3	119	129
Holy Cross	26	12	12	2	3	1	1	37	73	71	41	17	21	3	98	119
Mercyhurst	26	9	14	3	1	5	1	35	77	80	36	10	23	3	98	122
Bentley	26	8	16	2	1	1	1	27	61	89	34	11	21	2	81	124
Air Force	26	8	17	1	1	0	0	24	63	87	36	12	22	2	95	128
Championship: March 18, 2023 † indicates conference regular season champion (DeGregorio Trophy) * indicates conference tournament champion (Riley Trophy); Rankings: USCHO.com Top 20 Poll

== Schedule and results ==
Date	Time	Opponent^{#}	Rank^{#}	Site	TV	Decision	Result	Attendance	Record
Regular Season
October 1	7:05 PM	#16 Ohio State*		Mercyhurst Ice Center • Erie, Pennsylvania	FloHockey	Harmon	L 2–4	1,500	0–1–0
October 2	4:05 PM	#16 Ohio State*		Mercyhurst Ice Center • Erie, Pennsylvania	FloHockey	Harmon	L 1–4	716	0–2–0
October 7	7:00 PM	at Rensselaer*		Houston Field House • Troy, New York	ESPN+	Harmon	L 3–6	1,278	0–3–0
October 8	7:00 PM	at Rensselaer*		Houston Field House • Troy, New York	ESPN+	Lenz	L 2–3	1,732	0–4–0
October 13	7:00 PM	at #20 Penn State*		Pegula Ice Arena • University Park, Pennsylvania		Harmon	L 3–6	6,038	0–5–0
October 14	7:05 PM	#20 Penn State*		Mercyhurst Ice Center • Erie, Pennsylvania		Say	L 1–4	1,098	0–6–0
October 21	7:00 PM	at Clarkson*		Cheel Arena • Potsdam, New York	ESPN+	Say	W 2–1 ^{OT}	2,564	1–6–0
October 22	7:30 PM	at Clarkson*		Cheel Arena • Potsdam, New York	ESPN+	Say	L 1–5	3,003	1–7–0
October 28	7:35 PM	at Niagara		Dwyer Arena • Lewiston, New York	FloHockey	Lenz	T 4–4 ^{SOL}	708	1–7–1 (0–0–1)
October 29	7:00 PM	Niagara		Mercyhurst Ice Center • Erie, Pennsylvania	FloHockey	Say	L 2–3	612	1–8–1 (0–1–1)
November 4	7:05 PM	Sacred Heart		Mercyhurst Ice Center • Erie, Pennsylvania	FloHockey	Say	L 3–6	624	1–9–1 (0–2–1)
November 5	4:05 PM	Sacred Heart		Mercyhurst Ice Center • Erie, Pennsylvania	FloHockey	Harmon	T 3–3 ^{SOL}	212	1–9–2 (0–2–2)
November 12	1:00 PM	at Ferris State*		Ewigleben Arena • Big Rapids, Michigan (Exhibition)	FloHockey	Lenz	L 1–5	1,872	
November 18	6:00 PM	at Holy Cross		Hart Center • Worcester, Massachusetts	FloHockey	Say	W 3–1	517	2–9–2 (1–2–2)
November 19	2:30 PM	at Holy Cross		Hart Center • Worcester, Massachusetts	FloHockey	Harmon	W 4–1	307	3–9–2 (2–2–2)
November 25	7:05 PM	Air Force		Mercyhurst Ice Center • Erie, Pennsylvania	FloHockey	Say	W 5–3	400	4–9–2 (3–2–2)
November 26	4:05 PM	Air Force		Mercyhurst Ice Center • Erie, Pennsylvania	FloHockey	Harmon	W 4–2	300	5–9–2 (4–2–2)
December 9	7:05 PM	Army		Mercyhurst Ice Center • Erie, Pennsylvania	FloHockey	Say	W 4–3	1,184	6–9–2 (5–2–2)
December 10	7:05 PM	Army		Mercyhurst Ice Center • Erie, Pennsylvania	FloHockey	Harmon	L 2–3 ^{OT}	-	6–10–2 (5–3–2)
December 29	7:00 PM	at Sacred Heart		Total Mortgage Arena • Bridgeport, Connecticut	FloHockey	Say	L 3–4 ^{OT}	804	6–11–2 (5–4–2)
December 30	4:00 PM	at Sacred Heart		Total Mortgage Arena • Bridgeport, Connecticut	FloHockey	Harmon	L 1–4	981	6–12–2 (5–5–2)
January 7	7:00 PM	at USNTDP*		USA Hockey Arena • Plymouth, Michigan		Say	L 1–6	1,367	
January 13	7:05 PM	at RIT		Gene Polisseni Center • Henrietta, New York	FloHockey	Harmon	T 4–4 ^{SOW}	2,060	6–12–3 (5–5–3)
January 14	5:05 PM	at RIT		Gene Polisseni Center • Henrietta, New York	FloHockey	Harmon	L 0–1	3,181	6–13–3 (5–6–3)
January 20	7:05 PM	American International		Mercyhurst Ice Center • Erie, Pennsylvania	FloHockey	Harmon	W 4–1	600	7–13–3 (6–6–3)
January 21	4:05 PM	American International		Mercyhurst Ice Center • Erie, Pennsylvania	FloHockey	Harmon	L 1–2 ^{OT}	354	7–14–3 (6–7–3)
January 27	7:05 PM	Bentley		Mercyhurst Ice Center • Erie, Pennsylvania	FloHockey	Harmon	W 4–3	-	8–14–3 (7–7–3)
January 28	4:05 PM	Bentley		Mercyhurst Ice Center • Erie, Pennsylvania	FloHockey	Harmon	L 3–5	682	8–15–3 (7–8–3)
February 3	9:00 PM	at Air Force		Cadet Ice Arena • Colorado Springs, Colorado	Altitude 2	Harmon	L 3–4 ^{OT}	1,854	8–16–3 (7–9–3)
February 4	7:00 PM	at Air Force		Cadet Ice Arena • Colorado Springs, Colorado	Altitude 2	Harmon	L 2–4	2,290	8–17–3 (7–10–3)
February 10	7:05 PM	Canisius		Mercyhurst Ice Center • Erie, Pennsylvania	FloHockey	Harmon	L 3–4	-	8–18–3 (7–11–3)
February 11	4:00 PM	Canisius		Mercyhurst Ice Center • Erie, Pennsylvania	FloHockey	Harmon	L 0–2	473	8–19–3 (7–12–3)
February 17	7:00 PM	at Army		Tate Rink • West Point, New York	FloHockey	Harmon	L 2–3 ^{OT}	1,441	8–20–3 (7–13–3)
February 18	4:00 PM	at Army		Tate Rink • West Point, New York	FloHockey	Harmon	W 7–3	1,700	9–20–3 (8–13–3)
February 24	7:05 PM	Niagara		Mercyhurst Ice Center • Erie, Pennsylvania	FloHockey	Harmon	W 3–2	783	10–20–3 (9–13–3)
February 25	7:00 PM	at Niagara		Dwyer Arena • Lewiston, New York	FloHockey	Harmon	L 3–5	1,115	10–21–3 (9–14–3)
Atlantic Hockey Tournament
March 3	7:05 PM	at RIT*		Gene Polisseni Center • Henrietta, New York (Quarterfinal Game 1)	FloHockey	Harmon	L 3–5	2,259	10–22–3
March 4	7:05 PM	at RIT*		Gene Polisseni Center • Henrietta, New York (Quarterfinal Game 2)	FloHockey	Harmon	L 3–4 ^{OT}	2,901	10–23–3
*Non-conference game. ^{#}Rankings from USCHO.com Poll. All times are in Eastern Time. Source:

== Scoring statistics ==
Name	Position	Games	Goals	Assists	Points	PIM
Eric Esposito	LW	35	17	15	32	14
Steven Agriogianis	RW	23	4	15	19	2
Mickey Burns	LW	36	11	7	18	22
Rylee St. Onge	LW	24	8	7	15	8
Garrett Dahm	F	32	7	7	14	8
Marko Reifenberger	C	36	6	8	14	23
Cade Townend	D	36	3	11	14	12
Kyler Head	F	28	8	5	13	18
Carson Brière	C/RW	30	5	8	13	14
Jonathan Bendorf	LW	34	4	9	13	2
Dustin Geregach	D	32	3	10	13	10
Gueorgui Feduolov	F	35	6	6	12	20
Keanan Stewart	F	34	5	4	9	12
Brendon Michaelian	D	18	0	7	7	6
Joseph Maziarz	D	23	3	3	6	2
Paul Maust	LW	24	5	0	5	22
Dalton Hunter	RW	28	0	5	5	18
Adrien Bisson	F	36	0	5	5	13
Tommy Bannister	F	16	1	3	4	2
Philip Waugh	F/D	31	1	3	4	16
Owen Norton	D	36	0	4	4	41
Jake Beaune	D	30	1	1	2	22
Tyler Gaulin	F	10	0	1	1	6
Ryan Coughlin	F	17	0	1	1	6
Matt Lenz	G	4	0	0	0	0
Owen Say	G	11	0	0	0	0
Tyler Harmon	G	24	0	0	0	2
Total			98	145	243	321

== Goaltending statistics ==
Name	Games	Minutes	Wins	Losses	Ties	Goals against	Saves	Shut outs	SV %	GAA
Matt Lenz	8	153:46	0	1	1	6	78	0	.929	2.34
Tyler Harmon	25	1423:17	6	16	2	75	806	0	.915	3.16
Owen Say	14	602:06	4	6	0	34	317	0	.903	3.39
Empty Net	-	14:41	-	-	-	7	-	-	-	-
Total	36	2193:50	10	23	3	122	1201	0	.913	3.34

== Rankings ==
Poll	Week																											
Poll	Pre	1	2	3	4	5	6	7	8	9	10	11	12	13	14	15	16	17	18	19	20	21	22	23	24	25	26	27 (Final)
USCHO.com	NR	-	NR	NR	NR	NR	NR	NR	NR	NR	NR	NR	NR	-	NR	NR	NR	NR	NR	NR	NR	NR	NR	NR	NR	NR	-	NR
USA Today	NR	NR	NR	NR	NR	NR	NR	NR	NR	NR	NR	NR	NR	NR	NR	NR	NR	NR	NR	NR	NR	NR	NR	NR	NR	NR	NR	NR

Note: USCHO did not release a poll in weeks 1, 13, or 26.

== Awards and honors ==
Player	Award	Ref
Eric Esposito	Atlantic Hockey Regular Season Scoring Trophy	
Eric Esposito	Atlantic Hockey Second Team	
Owen Say	Atlantic Hockey Rookie Team	
