= 2022–23 Air Force Falcons men's ice hockey season =

College ice hockey team season

- Conference: 10th Atlantic Hockey
- Home ice: Cadet Ice Arena

Rankings
- USCHO: NR
- USA Today: NR

Record
- Overall: 12–22–2
- Conference: 8–17–1
- Home: 9–9–1
- Road: 3–12–1
- Neutral: 0–1–0

Coaches and captains
- Head coach: Frank Serratore
- Assistant coaches: Andy Berg; Joe Doyle
- Captain: Luke Rowe
- Alternate captain(s): Blake Bride; Willie Reim

The 2022–23 Air Force Falcons men's ice hockey season was the 55th season of play for the program and the 17th in the Atlantic Hockey conference. The Falcons represented the United States Air Force Academy and were coached by Frank Serratore, in his 26th season.

== Season ==
By returning most of the previous season's players, Air Force only had one real unknown about the team and that came in goal. With the graduation of Alex Schilling, coach Serratore turned to sophomore Guy Blessing as the Falcons' new starter. The young netminder played a bit inconsistently through the early part of the season but had the team in a good position by Thanksgiving. Unfortunately, it was at that time that the offense began to dry up. The Falcons went on a nine-game losing streak where they scored more than two goals on just one occasion. To make matters worse, Blessing had come down with a bursitis-related injury in early December. He attempted to play through the pain in the series against Holy Cross but it was too much for him to continue. While the team hoped that he would recover after the winter break, Blessing's condition did not improve enough and he ended up missing the remainder of the season.

In the meantime, a heavy snowfall caused the closure of the Buffalo airport, nessitating that the series with Canisius on December 30–31 be postponed. It was later rescheduled for February 13 and 14.

When the team finally returned to the ice in early January, coach Serratore was forced to alternate between his two upperclassmen goaltenders, Maiszon Balboa and Austin Park. This was caused in part because of the early departure of Aaron Randazzo but also because his replacement, Raymond Picard, had been playing on the Falcons' club team and was only there for emergencies. The two netminders combined to provide a stable situation in goal. Over the second half of the season, the Falcons received a nearly identical quality of goaltending that they had from Blessing. However, the Falcons were not fully able to solve their scoring woes. While the Falcons had a decent amount of depth scoring, they had no top-end players and just two players were able to get into double-digit-goal figures. Aside from a brief respite around early February, the entire team had trouble putting the puck in the net. Over the 18 games that Air Force played in 2023, they scored more than two goals in just seven of those matches, going 5–2 in those contests. In the others, the team went 1–10 and tumbled down the Atlantic Hockey standings, ending up in the conference cellar.

To compound the team's problems, the conference had changed the playoff format before the start of the season, eliminating the first round and starting with the quarterfinals. As a result, the Falcons ended up missing the postseason entirely, marking the first time that Air Force had missed the playoffs since joining the CHA back in 1999.

== Departures ==
Player	Position	Nationality	Cause
Billy Duma	Forward	United States	Left program (retired)
Frederick Paine	Defenseman	United States	Transferred to St. Scholastica
Aaron Randazzo	Goaltender	United States	Left program mid-season
Alex Schilling	Goaltender	United States	Graduation (retired)

== Recruiting ==
Player	Position	Nationality	Age	Notes
Liam Hansson	Forward/Defenseman	United States	20	Ramsey, NJ
Chris Hedden	Defenseman	United States	20	Kalamazoo, MI
Mason McCormick	Forward	United States	21	Verona, WI
Brett Oberle	Defenseman	United States	21	Woodbury, MN
Holt Oliphant	Forward	United States	21	Northbrook, IL
Raymond Picard	Goaltender	United States	18	Portland, CT; mid-season addition from the club team
Aaron Randazzo	Goaltender	United States	21	Annapolis, MD

== Roster ==
As of August 12, 2022

No.	Nat.	Player	Class	Pos	Height	Weight	DoB	Hometown	Previous team	NHL rights
1	(United States)	Guy Blessing	Sophomore	G	6' 3" (1.91 m)	180 lb (82 kg)	2001-05-08	Chandler, Arizona	Lone Star (NAHL)	—
2	(United States)	Andrew Kruse	Senior	D	6' 0" (1.83 m)	190 lb (86 kg)	1998-12-06	Delano, Minnesota	Minnesota Magicians (NAHL)	—
4	(United States)	Luke Rowe (C)	Junior	D	6' 1" (1.85 m)	206 lb (93 kg)	1998-08-08	Succasunna, New Jersey	Boston Jr. Bruins (NCDC)	—
6	(United States)	Chris Hedden	Freshman	D	6' 0" (1.83 m)	185 lb (84 kg)	2002-09-20	Kalamazoo, Michigan	Omaha (USHL)	—
7	(United States)	Brian Adams	Junior	F	5' 8" (1.73 m)	175 lb (79 kg)	1999-12-07	San Ramon, California	Wenatchee (BCHL)	—
8	(United States)	Blake Bride (A)	Senior	F	5' 11" (1.8 m)	180 lb (82 kg)	1998-04-22	Broomfield, Colorado	Sioux Falls (USHL)	—
9	(United States)	Lucas Coon	Sophomore	F	6' 0" (1.83 m)	190 lb (86 kg)	2001-11-24	Steamboat Springs, Colorado	Odessa (NAHL)	—
10	(United States)	Austin Schwartz	Sophomore	F	5' 9" (1.75 m)	170 lb (77 kg)	2001-06-18	Parker, Colorado	Bismarck (NAHL)	—
13	(United States)	Mason McCormick	Freshman	F	6' 3" (1.91 m)	190 lb (86 kg)	2001-05-25	Verona, Wisconsin	Waterloo (USHL)	—
14	(United States)	Jacob Marti	Junior	F	5' 11" (1.8 m)	185 lb (84 kg)	1999-06-10	Highlands Ranch, Colorado	Bismarck (NAHL)	—
15	(United States)	Bennett Norlin	Senior	F	6' 2" (1.88 m)	200 lb (91 kg)	1998-10-26	Farmington, Minnesota	West Kelowna (BCHL)	—
16	(United States)	Sam Brennan	Junior	D	6' 0" (1.83 m)	200 lb (91 kg)	2000-01-16	Brighton, Michigan	Lone Star (NAHL)	—
17	(United States)	Parker Brown	Junior	D	5' 10" (1.78 m)	155 lb (70 kg)	1999-09-08	Hanahan, South Carolina	Fairbanks (NAHL)	—
18	(United States)	Holt Oliphant	Freshman	F	5' 10" (1.78 m)	185 lb (84 kg)	2001-05-17	Northbrook, Illinois	Johnstown (NAHL)	—
20	(United States)	Brandon Koch	Senior	D	6' 0" (1.83 m)	185 lb (84 kg)	1999-01-18	Hastings, Minnesota	Wenatchee (BCHL)	—
21	(United States)	Liam Hansson	Freshman	D	6' 2" (1.88 m)	200 lb (91 kg)	2001-12-16	Ramsey, New Jersey	Cranbrook (BCHL)	—
22	(United States)	Drake Usher	Sophomore	D	6' 2" (1.88 m)	200 lb (91 kg)	2000-04-29	Upland, California	Wichita Falls (NAHL)	—
23	(United States)	Willie Reim (A)	Senior	F	6' 3" (1.91 m)	215 lb (98 kg)	1999-01-11	North Oaks, Minnesota	West Kelowna (BCHL)	—
24	(United States)	Nate Horn	Junior	F	5' 11" (1.8 m)	160 lb (73 kg)	1999-03-02	Elk River, Minnesota	Minnesota Wilderness (NAHL)	—
25	(United States)	Jason Kleinhans	Sophomore	F	5' 11" (1.8 m)	175 lb (79 kg)	2000-10-04	Herndon, Virginia	Danbury (NAHL)	—
26	(United States)	Clayton Cosentino	Sophomore	F	6' 2" (1.88 m)	190 lb (86 kg)	2000-06-18	San Carlos, California	Aberdeen (NAHL)	—
27	(United States)	Luke Robinson	Junior	D	6' 3" (1.91 m)	205 lb (93 kg)	2000-02-16	Nashville, Tennessee	Dubuque (USHL)	—
28	(United States)	Mitchell Digby	Sophomore	D	5' 11" (1.8 m)	185 lb (84 kg)	2000-06-26	Ottawa Lake, Michigan	Lone Star (NAHL)	—
29	(United States)	Jasper Lester	Sophomore	D	5' 11" (1.8 m)	175 lb (79 kg)	2000-07-31	Colorado Springs, Colorado	Fairbanks (NAHL)	—
30	(United States)	Aaron Randazzo	Freshman	G	6' 0" (1.83 m)	185 lb (84 kg)	2001-05-31	Alexandria, Minnesota	Green Bay (NAHL)	—
30	(United States)	Raymond Picard	Freshman	G	5' 10" (1.78 m)	178 lb (81 kg)	2004-03-18	Portland, Connecticut	Springfield Pics (USPHL)	—
37	(United States)	Will Gavin	Junior	F	5' 10" (1.78 m)	185 lb (84 kg)	1999-10-21	Durham, Connecticut	Northern (NCDC)	—
41	(United States)	Austin Park	Senior	G	5' 11" (1.8 m)	170 lb (77 kg)	1998-06-05	Highlands Ranch, Colorado	Wenatchee (BCHL)	—
47	(United States)	Dalton Weigel	Senior	D	6' 0" (1.83 m)	195 lb (88 kg)	1999-12-30	Bloomington, Minnesota	Aberdeen (NAHL)	—
51	(United States)	Maiszon Balboa	Junior	G	6' 2" (1.88 m)	185 lb (84 kg)	2000-04-18	Colorado Springs, Colorado	Shreveport (NAHL)	—
55	(United States)	Brett Oberle	Freshman	D	5' 11" (1.8 m)	180 lb (82 kg)	2001-09-27	Woodbury, Minnesota	Wenatchee (BCHL)	—
64	(United States)	Ty Pochipinski	Senior	F	5' 9" (1.75 m)	170 lb (77 kg)	1998-06-05	Colorado Springs, Colorado	Penticton (BCHL)	—
82	(United States)	Andrew DeCarlo	Sophomore	F	6' 0" (1.83 m)	185 lb (84 kg)	2000-07-23	Huntington Beach, California	Lone Star (NAHL)	—

== Standings ==
2022–23 Atlantic Hockey Standings
	Conference record										Overall record					
	GP	W	L	T	OW	OL	SW	PTS	GF	GA	GP	W	L	T	GF	GA
RIT †	26	18	7	1	1	3	0	57	85	55	39	25	13	1	127	100
American International	26	14	8	4	2	0	3	47	87	62	39	18	14	7	124	98
Sacred Heart	26	14	9	3	2	0	2	45	87	72	37	17	17	3	107	112
Canisius *	26	13	10	3	3	1	1	41	76	71	42	20	19	3	118	119
Army	26	12	12	2	3	3	1	39	72	81	37	14	19	4	98	119
Niagara	26	10	13	3	0	3	2	38	73	86	40	19	18	3	119	129
Holy Cross	26	12	12	2	3	1	1	37	73	71	41	17	21	3	98	119
Mercyhurst	26	9	14	3	1	5	1	35	77	80	36	10	23	3	98	122
Bentley	26	8	16	2	1	1	1	27	61	89	34	11	21	2	81	124
Air Force	26	8	17	1	1	0	0	24	63	87	36	12	22	2	95	128
Championship: March 18, 2023 † indicates conference regular season champion (DeGregorio Trophy) * indicates conference tournament champion (Riley Trophy); Rankings: USCHO.com Top 20 Poll

== Schedule and results ==
Date	Time	Opponent^{#}	Rank^{#}	Site	TV	Decision	Result	Attendance	Record
Exhibition
October 1	6:05 PM	Colorado College*		Cadet Ice Arena • Colorado Springs, Colorado (Exhibition)		Blessing	L 1–5	1,535	
Ice Breaker Tournament
October 7	7:05 PM	Maine*		Cadet Ice Arena • Colorado Springs, Colorado (Ice Breaker Tournament)	FloHockey	Randazzo	L 1–4	1,682	0–1–0
October 8	7:05 PM	#11 Notre Dame*		Cadet Ice Arena • Colorado Springs, Colorado (Ice Breaker Tournament)		Randazzo	T 5–5 ^{OT}	2,473	0–1–1
Regular Season
October 14	6:10 PM	at Lindenwood*		Centene Community Ice Center • St. Charles, Missouri		Randazzo	L 6–7	2,065	0–2–1
October 15	1:10 PM	at Lindenwood*		Centene Community Ice Center • St. Charles, Missouri		Blessing	W 5–3	1,073	1–2–1
October 20	7:05 PM	RIT		Cadet Ice Arena • Colorado Springs, Colorado	Altitude	Blessing	W 3–2	1,385	2–2–1 (1–0–0)
October 21	7:05 PM	RIT		Cadet Ice Arena • Colorado Springs, Colorado	FloHockey	Blessing	L 2–4	1,591	2–3–1 (1–1–0)
October 28	7:30 PM	at Colorado College*		Ed Robson Arena • Colorado Springs, Colorado (Rivalry)	ATTRM	Blessing	L 0–8	3,418	2–4–1
October 29	7:05 PM	Colorado College*		Cadet Ice Arena • Colorado Springs, Colorado (Rivalry)	Altitude 2	Blessing	W 6–3	2,050	3–4–1
November 4	7:05 PM	Alaska Anchorage*		Cadet Ice Arena • Colorado Springs, Colorado	FloHockey	Blessing	W 5–3	1,548	4–4–1
November 5	5:05 PM	Alaska Anchorage*		Cadet Ice Arena • Colorado Springs, Colorado	Altitude 2	Blessing	W 3–1	1,774	5–4–1
November 11	7:05 PM	Bentley		Cadet Ice Arena • Colorado Springs, Colorado	FloHockey	Blessing	L 1–5	1,507	5–5–1 (1–2–0)
November 12	8:05 PM	Bentley		Cadet Ice Arena • Colorado Springs, Colorado	Altitude 2	Blessing	W 2–0	1,353	6–5–1 (2–2–0)
November 19	11:05 AM	at American International		MassMutual Center • Springfield, Massachusetts	FloHockey	Blessing	T 3–3 ^{SOL}	347	6–5–2 (2–2–1)
November 20	5:05 PM	at American International		MassMutual Center • Springfield, Massachusetts	FloHockey	Blessing	L 1–3	199	6–6–2 (2–3–1)
November 25	5:05 PM	at Mercyhurst		Mercyhurst Ice Center • Erie, Pennsylvania	FloHockey	Blessing	L 3–5	400	6–7–2 (2–4–1)
November 26	2:05 PM	at Mercyhurst		Mercyhurst Ice Center • Erie, Pennsylvania	FloHockey	Blessing	L 2–4	300	6–8–2 (2–5–1)
December 2	7:05 PM	Holy Cross		Cadet Ice Arena • Colorado Springs, Colorado	FloHockey	Blessing	L 1–4	1,427	6–9–2 (2–6–1)
December 3	5:05 PM	Holy Cross		Cadet Ice Arena • Colorado Springs, Colorado	FloHockey	Blessing	L 1–2	1,493	6–10–2 (2–7–1)
Desert Hockey Classic
January 6	3:30 PM	vs. #6 Boston University*		Mullett Arena • Tempe, Arizona (Desert Hockey Classic Semifinal)		Balboa	L 1–5	-	6–11–2
January 7	7:00 PM	at Arizona State*		Mullett Arena • Tempe, Arizona (Desert Hockey Classic Consolation)		Balboa	L 0–2	-	6–12–2
January 13	5:05 PM	at Holy Cross		Hart Center • Worcester, Massachusetts	FloHockey	Park	L 2–5	462	6–13–2 (2–8–1)
January 15	2:05 PM	at Holy Cross		Hart Center • Worcester, Massachusetts	FloHockey	Park	L 1–4	321	6–14–2 (2–9–1)
January 20	7:05 PM	Niagara		Cadet Ice Arena • Colorado Springs, Colorado	FloHockey	Park	W 6–3	1,465	7–14–2 (3–9–1)
January 21	5:05 PM	Niagara		Cadet Ice Arena • Colorado Springs, Colorado	Altitude	Park	L 1–2	1,735	7–15–2 (3–10–1)
January 27	5:00 PM	at Army		Tate Rink • West Point, New York (Rivalry)	FloHockey	Balboa	L 1–3	2,600	7–16–2 (3–11–1)
January 28	2:00 PM	at Army		Tate Rink • West Point, New York (Rivalry)	FloHockey	Balboa	W 6–4	2,681	8–16–2 (4–11–1)
February 3	7:05 PM	Mercyhurst		Cadet Ice Arena • Colorado Springs, Colorado	Altitude 2	Balboa	W 4–3 ^{OT}	1,854	9–16–2 (5–11–1)
February 4	5:05 PM	Mercyhurst		Cadet Ice Arena • Colorado Springs, Colorado	Altitude 2	Balboa	W 4–2	2,290	10–16–2 (6–11–1)
February 10	5:05 PM	at Sacred Heart		Martire Family Arena • Fairfield, Connecticut	FloHockey, SNY	Balboa	W 5–4	4,087	11–16–2 (7–11–1)
February 11	5:05 PM	at Sacred Heart		Martire Family Arena • Fairfield, Connecticut	FloHockey	Balboa	L 3–5	4,152	11–17–2 (7–12–1)
February 13	7:05 PM	Canisius		Cadet Ice Arena • Colorado Springs, Colorado	Altitude 2	Park	W 2–1	1,067	12–17–2 (8–12–1)
February 14	7:05 PM	Canisius		Cadet Ice Arena • Colorado Springs, Colorado	Altitude 2	Park	L 1–4	962	12–18–2 (8–13–1)
February 17	7:05 PM	American International		Cadet Ice Arena • Colorado Springs, Colorado	Altitude 2	Park	L 2–3	1,850	12–19–2 (8–14–1)
February 18	5:05 PM	American International		Cadet Ice Arena • Colorado Springs, Colorado	FloHockey	Park	L 3–4	2,299	12–20–2 (8–15–1)
February 24	5:05 PM	at RIT		Gene Polisseni Center • Henrietta, New York	FloHockey	Balboa	L 1–3	2,835	12–21–2 (8–16–1)
February 25	3:05 PM	at RIT		Gene Polisseni Center • Henrietta, New York	FloHockey	Balboa	L 2–5	2,890	12–22–2 (8–17–1)
*Non-conference game. ^{#}Rankings from USCHO.com Poll. All times are in Mountain Time. Source:

== Scoring statistics ==
Name	Position	Games	Goals	Assists	Points	PIM
Willie Reim	F	36	11	15	26	34
Brandon Koch	D	36	6	18	24	36
Luke Rowe	D	33	7	17	24	37
Will Gavin	F	35	11	11	22	27
Clayton Cosentino	F	36	6	15	21	10
Nate Horn	F	33	8	9	17	8
Parker Brown	F	36	6	9	15	21
Andrew DeCarlo	F	33	5	8	13	34
Austin Schwartz	F	34	5	7	12	2
Sam Brennan	D	22	2	9	11	45
Chris Hedden	D	35	3	8	11	12
Holt Oliphant	F	27	4	5	9	6
Bennett Norlin	F	36	3	5	8	4
Mason McCormick	LW	34	6	2	8	49
Mitchell Digby	D	35	2	5	7	28
Jacob Marti	F	25	4	2	6	22
Brian Adams	F	27	3	2	5	10
Ty Pochipinski	F	14	1	3	4	8
Luke Robinson	D	32	1	2	3	30
Blake Bride	RW	10	1	1	2	6
Jasper Lester	D	18	0	2	2	6
Lucas Coon	D	9	0	2	2	2
Brett Oberle	D	7	0	1	1	4
Andrew Kruse	D	16	0	1	1	6
Guy Blessing	G	15	0	1	1	0
Raymond Picard	G	1	0	0	0	0
Drake Usher	D	2	0	0	0	2
Liam Hansson	F	12	0	0	0	2
Aaron Randazzo	G	3	0	0	0	0
Austin Park	G	11	0	0	0	2
Maiszon Balboa	G	13	0	0	0	0
Total			95	160	255	453

== Goaltending statistics ==
Name	Games	Minutes	Wins	Losses	Ties	Goals against	Saves	Shut-outs	SV %	GAA
Maiszon Balboa	13	664	4	6	0	34	286	0	.894	3.07
Austin Park	10	484	2	6	0	25	189	0	.883	3.10
Guy Blessing	15	800	6	8	1	43	343	1	.889	3.23
Aaron Randazzo	3	184	0	2	1	16	75	0	.824	5.23
Empty Net	-	39	-	-	-	10	-	-	-	-
Total	36	2,171	12	22	2	128	893	1	.875	3.53

== Rankings ==
Poll	Week																											
Poll	Pre	1	2	3	4	5	6	7	8	9	10	11	12	13	14	15	16	17	18	19	20	21	22	23	24	25	26	27 (Final)
USCHO.com	NR	-	NR	NR	NR	NR	NR	NR	NR	NR	NR	NR	NR	-	NR	NR	NR	NR	NR	NR	NR	NR	NR	NR	NR	NR	-	NR
USA Today	NR	NR	NR	NR	NR	NR	NR	NR	NR	NR	NR	NR	NR	NR	NR	NR	NR	NR	NR	NR	NR	NR	NR	NR	NR	NR	NR	NR

Note: USCHO did not release a poll in weeks 1, 13, or 26.

== Awards and honors ==
Player	Award	Ref
Luke Rowe	Atlantic Hockey Second Team	
Chris Hedden	Atlantic Hockey Rookie Team	
