= Cunniffe =

Cunniffe is a surname. Notable people with the surname include:

- Bernard Cunniffe, English professional rugby league footballer
- Emma Cunniffe (born 1973), British actress
- James Cunniffe (1896–1926), American armed robber
- John Cunniffe, defendant in Glik v. Cunniffe
- Paul Cunniffe (1961–2001), British-born, Irish singer-songwriter
- Tom Cunniffe, Gaelic footballer

== See also ==
- Cunniff
