= David Cunniff =

American ice hockey player and coach

- Born: October 9, 1970 (age 55) South Boston, Massachusetts, U.S.
- Height: 5 ft 10 in (178 cm)
- Weight: 180 lb (82 kg; 12 st 12 lb)
- Position: Left wing
- Shot: Left
- Played for: AHL; Albany River Rats; ECHL; Jacksonville Lizard Kings; Raleigh IceCaps; Louisiana IceGators; Richmond Renegades
- NHL draft: Undrafted
- Playing career: 1996–2002

David Cunniff (born October 9, 1970) is an American former professional ice hockey player. He was hired as the head coach of the Worcester Railers of the ECHL during the 2019–20 season.

== Playing career ==
Cunniff played his college hockey at Salem State College. He then played eight seasons of professional hockey in the AHL and ECHL, scoring 38 goals and 44 assists, with 555 penalty minutes, in 268 professional games played.

== Coaching career ==
For the 2002–03 season, Cunniff joined the Cleveland Barons of the AHL as an assistant coach, retaining that position when the team relocated to become the Worcester Sharks in 2006. On September 12, 2012, Cunniff was promoted to associate coach of the Worcester Sharks, working alongside head coach Roy Sommer. In June 2014, Cunniff left the Worcester Sharks.

On September 15, 2014, the Albany Devils added David Cunniff as an assistant coach, joining Sergei Brylin and goaltending coach Johan Hedberg on head coach Rick Kowalsky’s staff.

On August 11, 2015, the Iowa Wild hired Cunniff as an associate coach. On February 13, 2016, Cunniff was announced as the interim head coach of the club following the promotion of John Torchetti to the Minnesota Wild. Torchetti became the interim head coach following the dismissal of Mike Yeo. He returned to the associate position at the end of the 2015–16 season when Derek Lalonde was hired as the Iowa Wild head coach.

In 2019, he became an assistant coach with the Hartford Wolf Pack. On November 27, 2019, he was named the head coach and general manager of the Worcester Railers in the ECHL.

For the 2023-2024 season, Cunniff joined the AHL Utica Comets as an Assistant Coach.
