= Worcester Railers =

American minor league hockey team

- City: Worcester, Massachusetts
- League: ECHL
- Conference: Eastern
- Division: North
- Founded: 2017
- Home arena: DCU Center
- Colors: Steel blue, gray, white
- Owners: Worcester Pro Hockey, LLC (Cliff Rucker, Owner)
- General manager: Nick Tuzzolino
- Head coach: Nick Tuzzolino
- Media: Telegram & Gazette; WORC-FM; Charter TV3
- Affiliates: St. Louis Blues (NHL); Springfield Thunderbirds (AHL)
- Website: railershc.com

Franchise history
- 2017–present: Worcester Railers

The Worcester Railers (also called Worcester Railers HC) are a professional ice hockey team based in Worcester, Massachusetts. The team began play in the 2017–18 ECHL season, and is a member of the North Division of the Eastern Conference of the ECHL. The team plays their home games at the DCU Center and are the ECHL affiliate of the St Louis Blues since 2026. The team filled the void left by the AHL's Worcester Sharks, who relocated to San Jose, California, in 2015 to become the San Jose Barracuda.

== History ==
On January 26, 2015, it was reported that the Worcester Sharks would move to San Jose and share SAP Center at San Jose with their parent club, the San Jose Sharks. These reports were confirmed with the Sharks' official announcement on January 29. Worcester did not initially receive an ECHL team to replace the relocated AHL team, unlike the other markets with relocated AHL teams in 2015, such as Manchester, New Hampshire; Norfolk, Virginia; and Glens Falls, New York.

On February 8, 2016, the ECHL announced that Worcester would be home to an expansion team, set to begin play for the 2017–18 season. The team is owned by Cliff Rucker, with Toby O'Brien initially serving as president and general manager (although O'Brien would leave in May 2016 for an NHL job and replaced by former Worcester Sharks executive, Mike Myers, as president). The team is the ECHL's first franchise in Massachusetts and second in New England after the Manchester Monarchs. Early reports indicated that ownership group was considering Whitehawks, Railers, and Blast as the name of the team. The team unveiled their name and logo on April 3. On September 12, 2016, Jamie Russell was announced as the team's first head coach and general manager. He had served as head coach of the Elmira Jackals from 2014 to 2016. The team announced their first affiliation with the New York Islanders (NHL) and Bridgeport Islanders (AHL) at the end of the 2016–17 season.

The Railers played their first game on October 14, 2017, defeating the Monarchs 4–3 at the DCU Center in front of a crowd of 12,135. The first goal scored in franchise history was by forward Wade Murphy. The Railers qualified for the playoffs in their first season, losing to the Adirondack Thunder in the first round. They finished last in the competitive North Division in the 2018–19 season. The Railers then started the 2019–20 season with four wins in their first 15 games and fired head coach Jamie Russell. He was replaced by David Cunniff, who had been serving as an assistant with the Hartford Wolf Pack in the AHL.

Due to the COVID-19 pandemic, the Railers voluntarily suspended operations for the 2020–21 ECHL season.

On June 18, 2024, assistant coach Bob Deraney was promoted to head coach for the 2024–25 ECHL season, while Savannah Ghost Pirates assistant coach and director of player development Nick Tuzzolino was hired to be the organization's associate head coach and first-ever general manager.

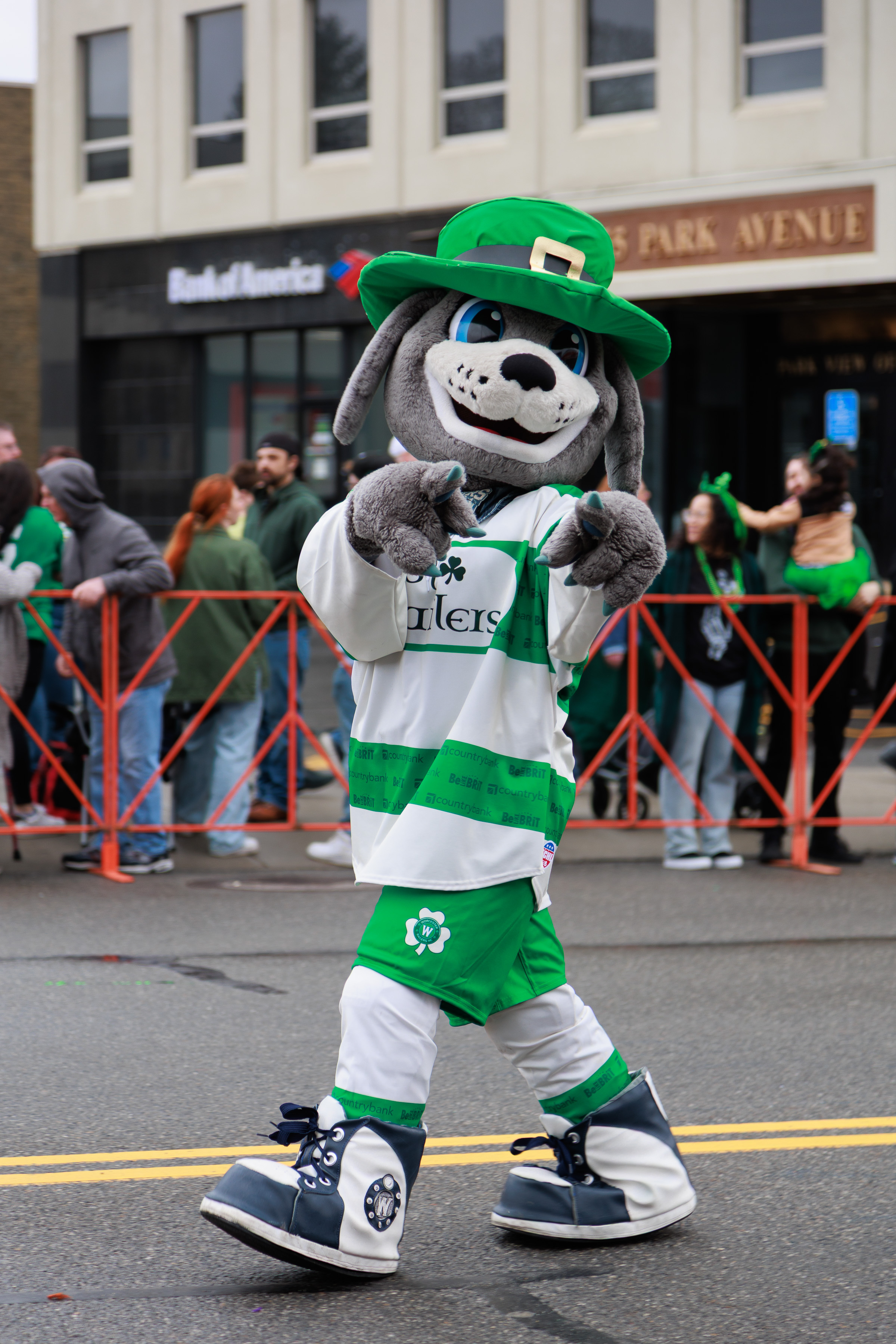
Trax the railyard dog, dressed for Saint Patrick's Day

On December 14, 2024, Deraney resigned as head coach to assume the duties of head of scouting, while Tuzzolino was named the new head coach.

On June 20, 2026, the Railers announced their new affiliation, now being with the St. Louis Blues of the NHL and the Springfield Thunderbirds of the AHL.

== Mascot ==
In 2016, the Railers debuted their mascot, Trax, a "friendly and loyal" railyard dog. The costumed mascot appears during all home games. The name "Trax" was chosen after a social media contest.

== Season-by-season records ==
Regular season										Playoffs				
Season	GP	W	L	OTL	SOL	Pts	GF	GA	Standing	Year	1st round	2nd round	3rd round	Kelly Cup
2017–18	72	37	27	4	4	82	194	193	4th, North	2018	L, 2–4, ADK	—	—	—
2018–19	72	32	29	7	4	75	196	226	7th, North	2019	did not qualify			
2019–20	61	21	36	4	0	46	161	230	6th, North	2020	Season cancelled due to COVID-19 pandemic			
2020–21	Opted out of participating due to the COVID-19 pandemic									2021	did not participate			
2021–22	71	32	32	5	2	71	227	245	5th, North	2022	did not qualify			
2022–23	72	34	34	4	0	72	227	242	5th, North	2023	did not qualify			
2023–24	72	32	32	5	3	72	210	238	5th, North	2024	did not qualify †			
2024–25	72	34	30	3	5	76	214	248	5th, North	2025	did not qualify			
2025–26	72	35	30	5	2	77	196	213	6th, North	2026	did not qualify			

† Points percentage was used to determine playoff seedings.

== NHL Affiliations ==
- 2017–18 until 2025–26
  - New York Islanders (NHL)
  - Bridgeport Sound Tigers (AHL)
- 2026–27 until 2030-31
  - St. Louis Blues (NHL)
  - Springfield Thunderbirds (AHL)
