= 2022–23 NCAA Division I men's ice hockey rankings =

- NCAA tournament: 2023
- NCAA champion: Quinnipiac
- Preseason No. 1 (USA Today): Denver
- Preseason No. 1 (USCHO): Denver
- NCAA Division I men's ice hockey rankings

Two human polls made up the 2022–23 NCAA Division I men's ice hockey rankings, the USCHO.com/CBS College Sports poll and the USA Today/USA Hockey Magazine poll. As the 2022–23 season progressed, rankings were updated weekly.

== Legend ==
	Increase in ranking
	Decrease in ranking
	Not ranked previous week
Italics	Number of first place votes
(#-#)	Win–loss–tie record
т	Tied with team above or below also with this symbol

== USCHO ==
	Preseason Sep 19	Week 2 Oct 3	Week 3 Oct 10	Week 4 Oct 17	Week 5 Oct 24	Week 6 Oct 31	Week 7 Nov 7	Week 8 Nov 14	Week 9 Nov 21	Week 10 Nov 28	Week 11 Dec 5	Week 12 Dec 12	Week 14 Jan 2	Week 15 Jan 9	Week 16 Jan 16	Week 17 Jan 23	Week 18 Jan 30	Week 19 Feb 6	Week 20 Feb 13	Week 21 Feb 20	Week 22 Feb 27	Week 23 Mar 6	Week 24 Mar 13	Week 25 Mar 20	Final Apr 10	
1.	Denver (37)	Denver (0–0–0) (41)	Denver (2–0–0) (46)	Minnesota (3–1–0) (31)	Minnesota (4–2–0) (21)	Michigan (7–1–0) (22)	Minnesota (7–3–0) (32)	Denver (9–3–0) (44)	Denver (9–3–0) (41)	Denver (10–4–0) (17)	Denver (12–4–0) (29)	Denver (14–4–0) (26)	Denver (16–4–0) (29)	Quinnipiac (17–1–3) (40)	Quinnipiac (18–1–3) (39)	St. Cloud State (18–6–0) (33)	Minnesota (20–7–1) (38)	Minnesota (20–7–1) (36)	Quinnipiac (24–3–3) (26)	Minnesota (23–8–1) (25)	Minnesota (25–8–1) (37)	Minnesota (25–8–1) (38)	Minnesota (26–8–1) (38)	Minnesota (26–9–1) (34)	Quinnipiac (34–4–3) (50)	1.
2.	Minnesota (8)	Minnesota (2–0–0) (6)	Minnesota (3–1–0) (1)	Minnesota State (3–1–0) (14)	St. Cloud State (6–0–0) (14)	Denver (6–2–0) (15)	Denver (7–3–0) (5)	Minnesota (8–4–0) (5)	Minnesota (10–4–0) (7)	Quinnipiac (10–1–3) (14)	Quinnipiac (12–1–3) (12)	Quinnipiac (14–1–3) (15)	Quinnipiac (15–1–3) (10)	Minnesota (16–6–0) (5)	Minnesota (17–6–1) (6)	Minnesota (18–7–1) (13)	Quinnipiac (20–3–3) (4)	Quinnipiac (22–3–3) (6)	Minnesota (21–8–1) (16)	Quinnipiac (26–3–3) (25)	Quinnipiac (28–3–3) (13)	Quinnipiac (28–3–3) (12)	Quinnipiac (30–3–3) (12)	Michigan (24–11–3) (9)	Minnesota (29–10–1)	2.
3.	Minnesota State (3)	North Dakota (0–0–0) (1)	North Dakota (2–0–0) (2)	Quinnipiac (2–0–2) (3)	Denver (4–2–0) (7)	Minnesota (5–3–0) (5)	Michigan (8–2–0) (3)	Michigan (9–3–0)	St. Cloud State (11–3–0) (2)	St. Cloud State (11–3–0) (10)	Minnesota (13–5–0) (6)	Minnesota (15–5–0) (9)	Minnesota (15–5–0) (11)	St. Cloud State (15–5–0) (2)	Denver (19–5–0) (4)	Quinnipiac (18–3–3) (2)	Boston University (19–6–0) (7)	Boston University (20–6–0) (8)	Denver (23–7–0) (7)	Denver (24–8–0)	Denver (26–8–0)	Denver (28–8–0)	Denver (30–8–0)	Quinnipiac (30–4–3) (4)	Michigan (26–12–3)	3.
4.	North Dakota	Minnesota Duluth (2–0–0)	Minnesota Duluth (2–0–0)	Denver (2–2–0)	Michigan (5–1–0) (6)	St. Cloud State (7–1–0) (6)	St. Cloud State (8–2–0) (5)	St. Cloud State (9–3–0)	Quinnipiac (9–1–2)	Minnesota (11–5–0) (3)	St. Cloud State (13–3–0) (3)	St. Cloud State (14–4–0)	St. Cloud State (14–4–0)	Denver (17–5–0) (3)	St. Cloud State (16–6–0) (1)	Boston University (17–6–0) (2)	Denver (20–7–0) (1)	Denver (21–7–0)	Michigan (20–9–1)	Michigan (20–10–2)	Michigan (20–11–3)	Michigan (22–11–3)	Michigan (23–11–3)	Denver (30–9–0) (2)	Boston University (29–11–0)	4.
5.	Minnesota Duluth	Minnesota State (0–0–0)	Minnesota State (1–1–0)	Michigan (3–1–0) (1)	Massachusetts (4–0–1) (2)	Massachusetts (5–1–1) (1)	Quinnipiac (5–1–2)	Quinnipiac (7–1–2)	Michigan (9–5–0)	Michigan (10–5–1) (2)	Penn State (14–4–0)	Penn State (15–5–0)	Penn State (17–5–0)	Penn State (17–5–0)	Boston University (15–6–0)	Denver (19–7–0)	St. Cloud State (18–8–0)	Michigan (18–9–1)	Boston University (20–7–0) (1)	Western Michigan (21–10–1)	Harvard (21–6–2)	Boston University (24–10–0)	Boston University (25–10–0)	Boston University (27–10–0) (1)	St. Cloud State (25–13–3)	5.
6.	Michigan (2)	Quinnipiac (0–0–0) (1)	Michigan (2–0–0) (1)	Massachusetts (2–0–1)	North Dakota (3–2–1)	Minnesota State (5–3–0)	Minnesota State (7–3–0)	Penn State (10–2–0) (1)	Connecticut (10–2–3)	Penn State (13–3–0) (4)	Michigan (11–6–1)	Merrimack (13–4–0)	Boston University (12–5–0)	Michigan (12–7–1)	Penn State (17–6–1)	Penn State (18–7–1)	Michigan (16–9–1)	St. Cloud State (18–8–2)	St. Cloud State (18–8–2)	St. Cloud State (18–9–3)	St. Cloud State (19–10–3)	Harvard (21–6–2)	Harvard (23–6–2)	St. Cloud State (24–12–3)	Denver (30–10–0)	6.
7.	Quinnipiac	Michigan (0–0–0) (1)	Northeastern (3–0–0)	North Dakota (2–1–1)	Quinnipiac (3–1–2)	Quinnipiac (3–1–2)	Connecticut (9–1–1) (2)	Connecticut (9–1–3)	Penn State (11–3–0)	Harvard (7–1–1)	Boston University (10–4–0)	Michigan (12–7–1)	Michigan (12–7–1)	Boston University (13–6–0)	Ohio State (15–8–1)	Michigan (14–9–1)	Ohio State (16–9–1)	Ohio State (17–10–1)	Penn State (19–10–1)	Harvard (19–6–2)	Boston University (22–10–0)	Western Michigan (23–12–1)	St. Cloud State (22–12–3)	Harvard (24–7–2)	Ohio State (21–16–3)	7.
8.	Northeastern	Northeastern (1–0–0)	Quinnipiac (1–0–1)	St. Cloud State (4–0–0) (1)	Minnesota State (3–3–0)	Connecticut (7–1–1) (1)	Penn State (9–1–0) (3)	Minnesota State (7–3–0)	Providence (8–2–3)	Connecticut (10–3–3)	Connecticut (11–4–3)	Boston University (11–5–0)	Merrimack (14–5–0)	Ohio State (14–7–1)	Michigan (13–8–1)	Ohio State (16–9–1)	Harvard (15–5–1)	Penn State (19–10–1)	Western Michigan (19–10–1)	Ohio State (18–11–3)	Western Michigan (21–12–1)	St. Cloud State (20–11–3)	Ohio State (20–15–3)	Ohio State (20–15–3)	Penn State (22–16–1)	8.
9.	Notre Dame	Boston University (1–0–0)	Boston University (1–0–0)	Boston University (2–1–0)	Boston University (3–2–0)	Ohio State (7–2–1)	Providence (6–2–1)	Providence (6–2–3)	Harvard (7–0–0)	Boston University (8–4–0)	Harvard (8–2–1)	Harvard (8–2–1)	Connecticut (13–5–3)	Harvard (10–4–1)	Harvard (12–4–1)	Western Michigan (16–9–1)	Penn State (18–9–1)	Western Michigan (19–10–1)	Harvard (17–6–1)	Boston University (20–10–0)	Ohio State (18–13–3)	Ohio State (20–14–3)	Western Michigan (23–14–1)	Western Michigan (23–14–1)	Cornell (21–11–2)	9.
10.	Massachusetts	St. Cloud State (2–0–0)	St. Cloud State (2–0–0)	Minnesota Duluth (2–2–0)	Connecticut (6–1–1)	North Dakota (3–3–1)	Ohio State (7–2–1)	Harvard (6–0–0)	Minnesota State (8–4–0)	Providence (9–3–3)	Providence (9–3–5)	Connecticut (11–5–3)	Harvard (9–3–1)	Merrimack (14–6–1)	Western Michigan (14–9–1)	Harvard (13–5–1)	Western Michigan (17–10–1)	Harvard (15–6–1)	Ohio State (17–11–2)	Penn State (19–12–1)	Penn State (20–13–1)	Michigan Tech (24–9–4)	Cornell (20–9–2)	Minnesota State (25–12–1)	Harvard (24–8–2)	10.
11.	Harvard	Notre Dame (0–0–0)	Ohio State (4–0–0)	Providence (3–0–0)	Ohio State (6–1–1)	Boston University (4–3–0)	Massachusetts (5–3–1)	Boston University (6–3–0)	Boston University (7–4–0)	Minnesota State (8–5–1)	Merrimack (11–4–0)	Michigan State (12–7–1)	Providence (11–4–5)	Connecticut (13–6–3)	Merrimack (15–7–1)	Cornell (12–6–1)	Cornell (13–7–1)	Cornell (15–7–1)	Cornell (16–7–2)	Michigan Tech (21–8–4)	Michigan Tech (22–9–4)	Penn State (21–15–1)	Penn State (21–15–1)	Penn State (21–15–1)	Western Michigan (23–15–1)	11.
12.	Boston University	Harvard (0–0–0)	Harvard (0–0–0)	Northeastern (3–1–0)	Notre Dame (3–2–1)	Notre Dame (4–2–2)	North Dakota (4–3–2)	Ohio State (7–4–1)	Ohio State (8–5–1)	Merrimack (10–3–0)	Michigan State (11–6–1)	Providence (9–4–5)	Ohio State (12–7–1)	Western Michigan (12–9–1)	Providence (12–6–6)	Connecticut (15–7–3)	Michigan Tech (18–7–4)	Michigan Tech (20–7–4)	Michigan Tech (21–8–4)	Minnesota State (20–11–1)	Cornell (18–9–2)	Cornell (18–9–2)	Minnesota State (24–12–1)	Cornell (20–10–2)	Minnesota State (25–13–1)	12.
13.	St. Cloud State	Massachusetts (0–0–0)	Massachusetts (0–0–1)	Notre Dame (2–1–1)	Providence (3–2–0)	Penn State (8–0–0)	Harvard (4–0–0)	UMass Lowell (7–3–0)	Merrimack (9–3–0)	Michigan State (11–4–1)	Massachusetts (7–5–3)	UMass Lowell (10–6–1)	Western Michigan (12–9–1)	Michigan Tech (14–6–3)	Connecticut (13–7–3)	Michigan Tech (16–7–4)	Minnesota State (18–9–1)	Connecticut (17–8–3)	Minnesota State (19–10–1)	Cornell (16–9–2)	Minnesota State (21–12–1)	Minnesota State (23–12–1)	Michigan Tech (24–10–4)	Michigan Tech (24–10–4)	Michigan Tech (24–11–4)	13.
14.	Western Michigan	Ohio State (2–0–0)	Notre Dame (0–1–1)	Connecticut (5–0–1)	Harvard (0–0–0)	Providence (4–2–1)	Boston University (4–3–0)	Western Michigan (8–5–0)	UMass Lowell (8–5–0)	Western Michigan (10–6–0)	UMass Lowell (9–6–1)	Ohio State (10–7–1)	Michigan State (12–9–1)	Providence (11–5–6)	Michigan Tech (15–7–3)	Minnesota State (16–9–1)	Connecticut (16–8–3)	Minnesota State (19–10–1)	Connecticut (17–10–3)	Omaha (17–10–3)	Omaha (18–11–3)	Merrimack (21–12–1)	Merrimack (22–12–1)	Merrimack (23–13–1)	Merrimack (23–14–1)	14.
15.	Providence	UMass Lowell (1–0–0)	Providence (1–0–0)	Harvard (0–0–0)	Northeastern (3–2–1)	Harvard (2–0–0)	Northeastern (6–2–2)	Merrimack (8–3–0)	Western Michigan (9–6–0)	Massachusetts (7–5–2)	Ohio State (10–7–1)	Massachusetts (7–6–3)	Massachusetts (8–7–3)	Cornell (10–5–1)	Michigan State (13–11–2)	Michigan State (13–11–2)	Merrimack (16–10–1)	Michigan State (15–13–2)	Omaha (15–10–3)	Northeastern (15–10–5)	Northeastern (16–11–5)	Northeastern (17–12–5)	Alaska (22–10–2)	Alaska (22–10–2)	Alaska (22–10–2)	15.
16.	Ohio State	Providence (0–0–0)	UMass Lowell (2–1–0)	Ohio State (4–1–1)	Penn State (6–0–0)	Northeastern (4–2–2)	UMass Lowell (7–3–0)	Massachusetts (5–5–1)	Michigan State (9–4–1)	UMass Lowell (9–6–0)	Minnesota State (8–7–1)	Minnesota State (10–7–1)	Michigan Tech (12–6–3)	UMass Lowell (11–8–1)	Cornell (10–6–1)	Merrimack (15–9–1)	UMass Lowell (15–9–1)	Omaha (14–10–2)	Northeastern (14–10–4)	Connecticut (17–10–3)	Merrimack (20–12–1)	Alaska (22–10–2)	Northeastern (17–13–5)	Northeastern (17–13–5)	Northeastern (17–13–5)	16.
17.	UMass Lowell	Clarkson (0–0–0)	Connecticut (4–0–0)	Western Michigan (4–1–0)	Western Michigan (5–2–0)	UMass Lowell (5–3–0)	Western Michigan (7–4–0)	Michigan State (8–3–1)	Massachusetts (6–5–1)	Ohio State (9–6–1)	Western Michigan (10–8–0)	Michigan Tech (10–4–3)	UMass Lowell (10–8–1)	Michigan State (12–11–1) т	Minnesota State (14–9–1)	Providence (12–7–6)	Michigan State (13–13–2)	UMass Lowell (15–10–2)	Michigan State (15–15–2)	Merrimack (18–12–1)	Connecticut (19–10–3)	Omaha (18–13–3)	North Dakota (18–14–6)	North Dakota (18–15–6)	North Dakota (18–15–6)	17.
18.	Clarkson	Western Michigan (1–1–0)	Western Michigan (2–1–0)	Penn State (4–0–0)	UMass Lowell (4–2–0)	Western Michigan (5–4–0)	Notre Dame (4–4–2)	Northeastern (6–3–3)	Northeastern (7–4–3)	Northeastern (7–5–3)	Michigan Tech (10–4–3)	Western Michigan (10–9–1)	Cornell (8–5–1)	Minnesota State (12–9–1) т	Boston College (9–6–4)	UMass Lowell (14–9–1)	RIT (18–7–1)	RIT (19–8–1)	UMass Lowell (15–10–3)	Michigan State (16–16–2)	Alaska (20–10–2)	Michigan State (18–17–2)	Omaha (19–15–3)	Michigan State (18–18–2)	Colgate (19–16–5)	18.
19.	Cornell	Cornell (0–0–0)	Cornell (0–0–0)	UMass Lowell (3–2–0)	Minnesota Duluth (2–4–0)	Minnesota Duluth (4–4–0)	Merrimack (6–3–0)	North Dakota (4–5–2)	Notre Dame (6–6–2)	Michigan Tech (9–3–3)	Notre Dame (7–7–2)	Notre Dame (8–8–2)	Minnesota State (10–9–1)	Massachusetts (9–8–3)	UMass Lowell (12–9–1)	RIT (17–6–1)	Omaha (14–10–2)	Merrimack (16–12–1)	Notre Dame (14–14–4)	UMass Lowell (16–11–3)	Notre Dame (15–14–5)	Connecticut (20–11–3)	Michigan State (18–18–2)	Colgate (19–15–5)	Michigan State (18–18–2)	19.
20.	Michigan Tech	Connecticut (2–0–0)	Penn State (2–0–0)	Cornell (0–0–0)	Cornell (0–0–0)	Bemidji State (3–2–1)	Minnesota Duluth (5–5–0)	Notre Dame (5–5–2)	RIT (10–2–0)	Notre Dame (7–7–2)	RIT (12–4–0)	RIT (12–4–0)	Notre Dame (9–9–2)	Boston College (8–6–4)	RIT (15–6–1)	Northeastern (12–9–3)	Notre Dame (13–12–3)	Alaska (15–9–2) т Northeastern (13–10–3) т	Merrimack (16–12–1)	Notre Dame (14–14–4)	Michigan State (16–16–2)	RIT (24–11–1)	UMass Lowell (18–14–3)	Omaha (19–15–3)	Omaha (19–15–3)	20.
	Preseason Sep 19	Week 2 Oct 3	Week 3 Oct 10	Week 4 Oct 17	Week 5 Oct 24	Week 6 Oct 31	Week 7 Nov 7	Week 8 Nov 14	Week 9 Nov 21	Week 10 Nov 28	Week 11 Dec 5	Week 12 Dec 12	Week 14 Jan 2	Week 15 Jan 9	Week 16 Jan 16	Week 17 Jan 23	Week 18 Jan 30	Week 19 Feb 6	Week 20 Feb 13	Week 21 Feb 20	Week 22 Feb 27	Week 23 Mar 6	Week 24 Mar 13	Week 25 Mar 20	Final Apr 10	
		Dropped: Michigan Tech	Dropped: Clarkson	None	None	Dropped: Cornell	Dropped: Bemidji State	Dropped: Minnesota Duluth	Dropped: North Dakota	Dropped: RIT	Dropped: Northeastern	None	Dropped: RIT	Dropped: Notre Dame	Dropped: Massachusetts	Dropped: Boston College	Dropped: Providence; Northeastern	Dropped: Notre Dame	Dropped: RIT; Alaska	None	Dropped: UMass Lowell	Dropped: Notre Dame	Dropped: Connecticut; RIT	Dropped: UMass Lowell	None	

== USA Today ==
	Preseason Sep 19	Week 1 Sep 26	Week 2 Oct 3	Week 3 Oct 10	Week 4 Oct 17	Week 5 Oct 24	Week 6 Oct 31	Week 7 Nov 7	Week 8 Nov 14	Week 9 Nov 21	Week 10 Nov 28	Week 11 Dec 5	Week 12 Dec 12	Week 13 Dec 19	Week 14 Jan 2	Week 15 Jan 9	Week 16 Jan 16	Week 17 Jan 23	Week 18 Jan 30	Week 19 Feb 6	Week 20 Feb 13	Week 21 Feb 20	Week 22 Feb 27	Week 23 Mar 6	Week 24 Mar 13	Week 25 Mar 20	Week 26 Mar 27	Final Apr 10	
1.	Denver (25)	Denver (0–0–0) (25)	Denver (0–0–0) (30)	Denver (2–0–0) (33)	Minnesota (3–1–0) (21)	Minnesota (4–2–0) (14)	Michigan (7–1–0) (15)	Minnesota (7–3–0) (24)	Denver (9–3–0) (29)	Denver (9–3–0) (25)	Minnesota (11–5–0) (11)	Denver (12–4–0) (14)	Denver (14–4–0) (15)	Minnesota (15–5–0) (15)	Minnesota (15–5–0) (15)	Quinnipiac (17–1–3) (23)	Quinnipiac (18–1–3) (29)	St. Cloud State (18–6–0) (21)	Minnesota (20–7–1) (27)	Minnesota (20–7–1) (31)	Quinnipiac (24–3–3) (21)	Minnesota (23–8–1) (17)	Minnesota (25–8–1) (27)	Minnesota (25–8–1) (29)	Minnesota (26–8–1) (28)	Minnesota (26–9–1) (27)	Minnesota (28–9–1) (30)	Quinnipiac (34–4–3) (34)	1.
2.	Minnesota (7)	Minnesota (0–0–0) (7)	Minnesota (2–0–0) (4)	Minnesota (3–1–0) (1)	Minnesota State (3–1–0) (8)	St. Cloud State (6–0–0) (8)	Denver (6–2–0) (15)	Denver (7–3–0) (1)	Minnesota (8–4–0) (3)	Minnesota (10–4–0) (9)	Denver (10–4–0) (10)	Minnesota (13–5–0) (16)	Minnesota (15–5–0) (13)	Denver (16–4–0) (13)	Denver (16–4–0) (14)	Minnesota (16–6–0) (9)	Minnesota (17–6–1) (4)	Minnesota (18–7–1) (12)	Quinnipiac (20–3–3) (2)	Quinnipiac (22–3–3)	Minnesota (21–8–1) (12)	Quinnipiac (26–3–3) (17)	Quinnipiac (28–3–3) (7)	Quinnipiac (28–3–3) (5)	Quinnipiac (30–3–3) (6)	Michigan (24–11–3) (4)	Michigan (26–11–3) (4)	Minnesota (29–10–1)	2.
3.	Minnesota State (2)	Minnesota State (0–0–0) (2)	North Dakota (0–0–0)	North Dakota (1–0–0)	Quinnipiac (2–0–2) (5)	Denver (4–2–0) (4)	Minnesota (5–3–0) (3)	Michigan (8–2–0) (3)	Michigan (9–3–0)	St. Cloud State (11–3–0)	St. Cloud State (11–3–0) (3)	Quinnipiac (12–1–3) (4)	Quinnipiac (14–1–3) (6)	Quinnipiac (14–1–3) (6)	Quinnipiac (15–1–3) (5)	Denver (17–5–0) (2)	Denver (19–5–0)	Denver (19–7–0)	Boston University (19–6–0) (3)	Boston University (20–6–0) (3)	Denver (23–7–0) (1)	Denver (24–8–0)	Denver (26–8–0)	Denver (28–8–0)	Denver (30–8–0)	Quinnipiac (30–4–3) (1)	Quinnipiac (32–4–3)	Michigan (26–12–3)	3.
4.	North Dakota	North Dakota (0–0–0)	Minnesota Duluth (2–0–0)	Minnesota Duluth (2–0–0)	Denver (2–2–0)	Michigan (5–1–0) (3)	St. Cloud State (7–1–0) (1)	St. Cloud State (8–2–0) (3)	Quinnipiac (7–1–2)	Quinnipiac (9–1–2)	Quinnipiac (10–1–3) (8)	St. Cloud State (13–3–0)	St. Cloud State (14–4–0)	St. Cloud State (14–4–0)	St. Cloud State (14–4–0)	St. Cloud State (15–5–0)	St. Cloud State (16–6–0) (1)	Quinnipiac (18–3–3)	Denver (20–7–0) (2)	Denver (21–7–0)	Michigan (20–9–1)	Michigan (20–10–2)	Michigan (20–11–3)	Michigan (22–11–3)	Michigan (23–11–3)	Denver (30–9–0)	Boston University (29–10–0)	Boston University (29–11–0)	4.
5.	Minnesota Duluth	Minnesota Duluth (0–0–0)	Minnesota State (0–0–0)	Minnesota State (1–1–0)	Michigan (3–1–0)	Massachusetts (4–0–1) (4)	Massachusetts (5–1–1)	Quinnipiac (5–1–2)	St. Cloud State (9–3–0)	Michigan (9–5–0)	Penn State (13–3–0) (2)	Penn State (14–4–0)	Merrimack (13–4–0)	Penn State (15–5–0)	Penn State (17–5–0)	Penn State (17–5–0)	Boston University (15–6–0)	Boston University (17–6–0)	St. Cloud State (18–8–0)	Michigan (18–9–1)	Boston University (20–7–0)	Western Michigan (21–10–1)	Harvard (21–6–2)	Harvard (21–6–2)	Boston University (25–10–0)	Boston University (27–10–0) (2)	St. Cloud State (25–13–3)	St. Cloud State (25–13–3)	5.
6.	Michigan (2)	Michigan (0–0–0)	Michigan (0–0–0)	Michigan (2–0–0)	Massachusetts (2–0–1)	Quinnipiac (3–1–2)	Quinnipiac (3–1–2)	Minnesota State (7–3–0)	Penn State (10–2–0) (2)	Connecticut (10–2–3)	Michigan (10–5–1)	Boston University (10–4–0)	Penn State (15–5–0)	Merrimack (13–4–0)	Boston University (12–5–0)	Michigan (12–7–1)	Penn State (17–6–1)	Penn State (18–7–1)	Michigan (16–9–1)	St. Cloud State (18–8–2)	St. Cloud State (18–8–2)	St. Cloud State (18–9–3)	St. Cloud State (19–10–3)	Boston University (24–10–0)	Harvard (23–6–2)	St. Cloud State (24–12–3)	Ohio State (21–16–3)	Denver (30–10–0)	6.
7.	Quinnipiac	Quinnipiac (0–0–0)	Quinnipiac (0–0–0)	Quinnipiac (1–0–1)	North Dakota (2–1–1)	North Dakota (3–2–1)	Minnesota State (5–3–0)	Penn State (9–1–0)	Minnesota State (7–3–0)	Penn State (11–3–0)	Boston University (8–4–0)	Michigan (11–6–1)	Boston University (11–5–0)	Boston University (11–5–0)	Michigan (12–7–1)	Boston University (13–6–0)	Michigan (13–8–1)	Michigan (14–9–1)	Ohio State (16–9–1)	Ohio State (17–10–1)	Penn State (19–10–1)	Ohio State (18–11–3)	Boston University (22–10–0)	St. Cloud State (20–11–3)	St. Cloud State (22–12–3)	Harvard (24–7–2)	Denver (30–10–0)	Ohio State (21–16–3)	7.
8.	Notre Dame	Notre Dame (0–0–0)	Northeastern (1–0–0)	Northeastern (3–0–0)	St. Cloud State (4–0–0)	Minnesota State (3–3–0)	Connecticut (7–1–1)	Connecticut (9–1–1)	Connecticut (9–1–3)	Providence (8–2–3)	Connecticut (10–3–3)	Connecticut (11–4–3)	Michigan (12–7–1)	Michigan (12–7–1)	Merrimack (14–5–0)	Ohio State (14–7–1)	Ohio State (15–8–1)	Ohio State (16–9–1)	Harvard (15–5–1)	Penn State (19–10–1)	Western Michigan (19–10–1)	Boston University (20–10–0)	Western Michigan (21–12–1)	Western Michigan (23–12–1)	Ohio State (20–14–3)	Ohio State (20–14–3)	Penn State (22–16–1)	Penn State (22–16–1)	8.
9.	Northeastern	Northeastern (0–0–0)	Notre Dame (0–0–0)	Boston University (1–0–0)	Providence (3–0–0)	Boston University (3–2–0)	Ohio State (7–2–1)	Providence (6–2–1)	Boston University (6–3–0)	Harvard (7–0–0)	Harvard (7–1–1)	Harvard (8–2–1)	Harvard (8–2–1)	Harvard (8–2–1)	Harvard (9–3–1)	Harvard (10–4–1)	Harvard (12–4–1)	Western Michigan (16–9–1)	Penn State (18–9–1)	Western Michigan (19–10–1)	Ohio State (17–11–2)	Harvard (19–6–2)	Ohio State (18–12–3)	Ohio State (20–13–3)	Western Michigan (23–14–1)	Minnesota State (25–12–1)	Cornell (21–11–2)	Cornell (21–11–2)	9.
10.	Massachusetts	Massachusetts (0–0–0)	Harvard (0–0–0)	St. Cloud State (2–0–0)	Minnesota Duluth (2–2–0)	Connecticut (6–1–1)	Penn State (8–0–0)	Massachusetts (5–3–1)	Providence (6–2–3)	Minnesota State (8–4–0)	Providence (9–3–3)	Merrimack (11–4–0)	Connecticut (11–5–3)	Connecticut (11–5–3)	Connecticut (13–5–3)	Merrimack (14–6–1)	Western Michigan (14–9–1)	Harvard (13–5–1)	Western Michigan (17–10–1)	Harvard (15–6–1)	Harvard (17–6–1)	Penn State (19–12–1)	Penn State (20–13–1)	Michigan Tech (24–9–4)	Penn State (21–15–1)	Penn State (21–15–1)	Harvard (24–8–2)	Harvard (24–8–2)	10.
11.	Harvard	Harvard (0–0–0)	St. Cloud State (2–0–0)	Ohio State (4–0–0)	Boston University (2–1–0)	Ohio State (6–1–1)	North Dakota (3–3–1)	Ohio State (7–2–1)	Harvard (6–0–0)	Boston University (7–4–0)	Michigan State (11–4–1)	Providence (9–3–5)	Michigan State (12–7–1)	Michigan State (12–7–1)	Providence (11–4–5)	Connecticut (13–6–3)	Merrimack (15–7–1)	Cornell (12–6–1)	Cornell (13–7–1)	Cornell (15–7–1)	Cornell (16–7–2)	Michigan Tech (21–8–4)	Michigan Tech (22–9–4)	Penn State (21–15–1)	Cornell (20–9–2)	Western Michigan (23–14–1)	Western Michigan (23–15–1)	Minnesota State (25–13–1)	11.
12.	Western Michigan	Western Michigan (0–0–0)	Boston University (1–0–0)	Harvard (0–0–0)	Notre Dame (2–1–1)	Notre Dame (3–2–1)	Notre Dame (4–2–2)	Harvard (4–0–0)	Western Michigan (8–5–0)	Ohio State (8–5–1)	Merrimack (10–3–0)	Massachusetts (7–5–3)	Providence (9–4–5)	Providence (9–4–5)	Ohio State (12–7–1)	Western Michigan (12–9–1)	Cornell (10–6–1)	Connecticut (15–7–3)	Michigan Tech (18–7–4)	Michigan Tech (20–7–4)	Minnesota State (19–10–1)	Minnesota State (20–11–1)	Minnesota State (21–12–1)	Minnesota State (23–12–1)	Minnesota State (24–12–1)	Cornell (20–10–2)	Minnesota State (25–13–1)	Western Michigan (23–15–1)	12.
13.	St. Cloud State	St. Cloud State (0–0–0)	Massachusetts (0–0–0)	Notre Dame (0–1–1)	Connecticut (5–0–1)	Harvard (0–0–0) т	Boston University (4–3–0)	North Dakota (4–3–2)	Ohio State (7–4–1)	UMass Lowell (8–5–0)	Minnesota State (8–5–1)	Michigan State (11–6–1)	UMass Lowell (10–6–1)	UMass Lowell (10–6–1)	Michigan State (12–9–1)	Michigan Tech (14–6–3)	Providence (12–6–6)	Michigan Tech (16–7–4)	Minnesota State (18–9–1)	Minnesota State (19–10–1)	Michigan Tech (21–8–4)	Cornell (16–9–2)	Cornell (18–9–2)	Cornell (18–9–2)	Michigan Tech (24–10–4)	Michigan Tech (24–10–4)	Michigan Tech (24–11–4)	Michigan Tech (24–11–4)	13.
14.	Boston University	Boston University (0–0–0)	Ohio State (2–0–0)	Massachusetts (0–0–1)	Northeastern (3–1–0)	Providence (3–2–0) т	Providence (4–2–1)	Boston University (4–3–0)	UMass Lowell (7–3–0)	Merrimack (9–3–0)	Western Michigan (10–6–0)	Ohio State (10–7–1)	Ohio State (10–7–1)	Ohio State (12–7–1)	Western Michigan (12–9–1)	Cornell (10–5–1)	Michigan Tech (15–7–3)	Minnesota State (16–9–1)	Connecticut (16–8–3)	Connecticut (17–8–3)	Michigan State (15–15–2)	Northeastern (15–10–5)	Omaha (18–11–3)	Merrimack (21–12–1)	Merrimack (22–12–1)	Merrimack (23–13–1)	Merrimack (23–14–1)	Merrimack (23–14–1)	14.
15.	Providence	Providence (0–0–0)	UMass Lowell (1–0–0)	Providence (1–0–0)	Harvard (0–0–0)	Penn State (6–0–0)	Harvard (2–0–0)	Northeastern (6–2–2)	Massachusetts (5–5–1)	Western Michigan (9–6–0)	Massachusetts (7–5–2)	UMass Lowell (9–6–1)	Massachusetts (7–6–3)	Massachusetts (7–6–3)	Massachusetts (8–7–3)	Providence (11–5–6)	Michigan State (13–11–2)	Michigan State (13–11–2)	UMass Lowell (15–9–1)	Michigan State (15–13–2)	Omaha (15–10–3)	Omaha (17–10–3)	Merrimack (20–12–1)	Alaska (22–10–2)	Alaska (22–10–2)	Alaska (22–10–2)	Alaska (22–10–2)	Alaska (22–10–2)	15.
16.	UMass Lowell	UMass Lowell (0–0–0)	Providence (0–0–0)	UMass Lowell (2–1–0)	Ohio State (4–1–1)	Western Michigan (5–2–0)	Northeastern (4–2–2)	UMass Lowell (7–3–0) т	Northeastern (6–3–3)	Michigan State (9–4–1)	UMass Lowell (9–6–0)	Minnesota State (8–7–1)	Minnesota State (10–7–1)	Michigan Tech (11–5–3)	Michigan Tech (12–6–3)	Michigan State (12–11–1)	Connecticut (13–7–3)	Providence (12–7–6)	Omaha (14–10–2)	Omaha (14–10–2)	Northeastern (14–10–4)	Merrimack (18–12–1)	Northeastern (16–11–5)	Northeastern (17–12–5)	North Dakota (18–14–6)	North Dakota (18–15–6)	North Dakota (18–15–6)	Northeastern (17–13–5)	16.
17.	Clarkson	Clarkson (0–0–0)	Clarkson (0–0–0)	Connecticut (4–0–0)	Western Michigan (4–1–0)	Northeastern (3–2–1)	UMass Lowell (5–3–0)	Western Michigan (7–4–0) т	Merrimack (8–3–0)	Massachusetts (6–5–1)	Ohio State (9–6–1)	Western Michigan (10–8–0)	Michigan Tech (10–4–3)	Notre Dame (8–8–2)	Cornell (8–5–1)	Massachusetts (9–8–3) т	Minnesota State (14–9–1)	Merrimack (15–9–1)	Notre Dame (13–12–3)	Northeastern (13–10–3)	Connecticut (17–10–3)	Connecticut (17–10–3)	Notre Dame (15–14–5)	Michigan State (18–17–2)	Michigan State (18–18–2)	Northeastern (17–13–5)	Michigan State (18–18–2)	Michigan State (18–18–2)	17.
18.	Ohio State	Ohio State (0–0–0)	Western Michigan (1–1–0)	Western Michigan (2–1–0)	Penn State (4–0–0)	UMass Lowell (4–2–0)	Western Michigan (5–4–0)	Notre Dame (4–4–2)	Michigan State (8–3–1)	Northeastern (7–4–3)	Michigan Tech (9–3–3)	Michigan Tech (10–4–3)	Notre Dame (8–8–2)	Minnesota State (10–9–1)	Notre Dame (9–9–2)	Minnesota State (12–9–1) т	Boston College (9–6–4)	RIT (17–6–1)	Merrimack (16–10–1)	RIT (19–8–1)	Notre Dame (14–14–4)	Michigan State (16–16–2)	Connecticut (19–10–3)	Omaha (18–13–3)	Northeastern (17–13–5)	Michigan State (18–18–2)	Northeastern (17–13–5)	North Dakota (18–15–6)	18.
19.	Cornell	Cornell (0–0–0)	Cornell (0–0–0)	Cornell (0–0–0)	Cornell (0–0–0)	Minnesota Duluth (2–4–0)	Minnesota Duluth (4–4–0)	Merrimack (6–3–0)	North Dakota (4–5–2)	Notre Dame (6–6–2)	Northeastern (7–5–3)	Notre Dame (7–7–2)	Western Michigan (10–9–1)	Western Michigan (10–9–1)	UMass Lowell (10–8–1)	Boston College (8–6–4)	RIT (15–6–1)	UMass Lowell (14–9–1)	Michigan State (13–13–2)	Merrimack (16–12–1)	UMass Lowell (15–10–3)	Notre Dame (14–14–4)	Alaska (20–10–2)	Connecticut (20–11–3)	Omaha (19–15–3)	Colgate (19–15–5)	Notre Dame (16–16–5)	Notre Dame (16–16–5)	19.
20.	Northern Michigan	Northern Michigan (0–0–0)	Michigan Tech (0–0–0)	Northern Michigan (3–1–0)	UMass Lowell (3–2–0)	Cornell (0–0–0)	Arizona State (5–4–0)	Arizona State (5–4–0) т Bemidji State (4–2–2) т	Notre Dame (5–5–2)	Michigan Tech (8–3–2)	Notre Dame (7–7–2)	Cornell (7–5–0)	Cornell (7–5–0)	RIT (12–4–0)	Bemidji State (9–5–4)	UMass Lowell (11–8–1)	UMass Lowell (12–9–1)	Notre Dame (11–12–2)	Northeastern (12–9–3)	UMass Lowell (15–10–2)	Merrimack (16–12–1)	UMass Lowell (16–11–3)	Michigan State (16–16–2)	Notre Dame (16–16–5)	Notre Dame (16–16–5)	Notre Dame (16–16–5)	Colgate (19–16–5)	Colgate (19–16–5)	20.
	Preseason Sep 19	Week 1 Sep 26	Week 2 Oct 3	Week 3 Oct 10	Week 4 Oct 17	Week 5 Oct 24	Week 6 Oct 31	Week 7 Nov 7	Week 8 Nov 14	Week 9 Nov 21	Week 10 Nov 28	Week 11 Dec 5	Week 12 Dec 12	Week 13 Dec 19	Week 14 Jan 2	Week 15 Jan 9	Week 16 Jan 16	Week 17 Jan 23	Week 18 Jan 30	Week 19 Feb 6	Week 20 Feb 13	Week 21 Feb 20	Week 22 Feb 27	Week 23 Mar 6	Week 24 Mar 13	Week 25 Mar 20	Week 26 Mar 27	Final Apr 10	
		None	Dropped: Northern Michigan	Dropped: Clarkson; Michigan Tech	Dropped: Northern Michigan	None	Dropped: Cornell	Dropped: Minnesota Duluth	Dropped: Arizona State; Bemidji State	Dropped: North Dakota	None	Dropped: Northeastern	None	Dropped: Cornell	Dropped: Minnesota State; RIT	Dropped: Notre Dame; Bemidji State	Dropped: Massachusetts	Dropped: Boston College	Dropped: Providence; RIT	Dropped: Notre Dame	Dropped: RIT	None	Dropped: UMass Lowell	None	Dropped: Connecticut	Dropped: Omaha	None	None	
